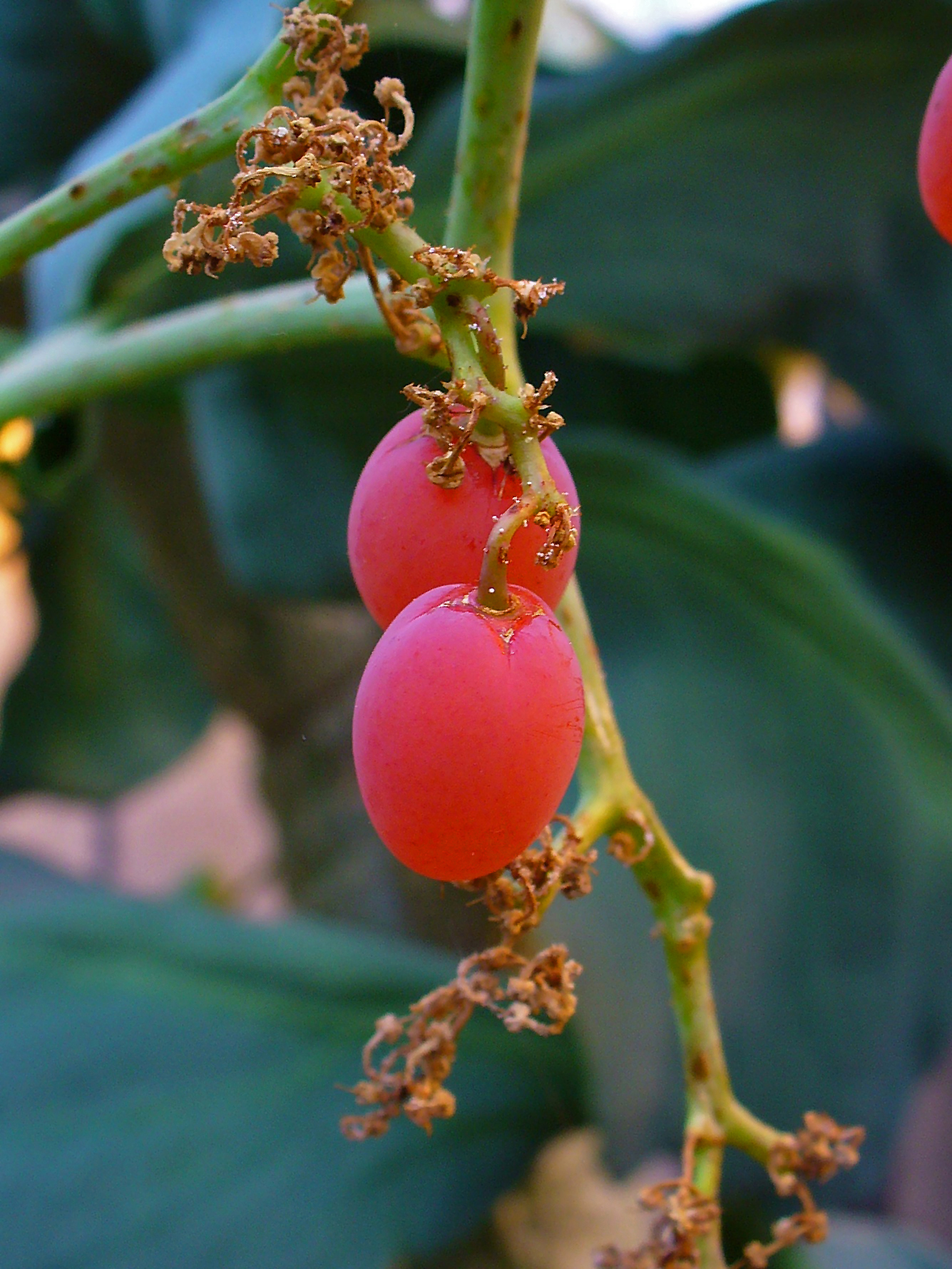

Conservation status
- Least Concern (IUCN 3.1)

Scientific classification
- Kingdom: Plantae
- Clade: Tracheophytes
- Clade: Angiosperms
- Clade: Eudicots
- Clade: Rosids
- Order: Vitales
- Family: Vitaceae
- Genus: Cyphostemma
- Species: C. bainesii

Binomial name
- Cyphostemma bainesii (Hook. f.) Desc.

Synonyms
- Cissus bainesii (Hook.) Gilg & M.Brandt; Vitis bainesii Hook.

= Cyphostemma bainesii =

Species of vine

Cyphostemma bainesii is a species of tree endemic to Namibia. It grows up to 1 m (3 ft) in height, with green leaves up to 27 cm (11 in) long by 11 cm (4 in) wide. The tree is mildly poisonous. It grows in hilly areas, including Naukluft Mountain Zebra Park, at elevations of 1,200–1,800 m (4,000–6,000 ft).
