= Laza =

Laza may refer to:

== Places ==
- Laza, Qabala, a village in Qabala Rayon, Azerbaijan
- Laza, Qusar, a village in Qusar Rayon, Azerbaijan
- Laza, Spain, a municipality in the province of Ourense, Galicia region of north-west Spain
  - Laza mine, an open pit mine near the municipality
- Laza, Vaslui, a commune in Vaslui County, Romania
- Laža parish, an administrative unit of Aizpute Municipality, Latvia
- Laza River, a river tributary in Romania

== People ==
- Laza Kostić (1842–1909), Serbian writer, philosopher, and politician
- Laza Lazarević (1851–1891), Serbian writer, psychiatrist, and neurologist
- Laza Morgan (born 1978), Jamaican American reggae singer and rapper
- Laza Razanajatovo (Laza), Malagasy filmmaker, film producer and film festival organiser
- Laza Ristovski (1956–2007), Serbian and former Yugoslav keyboardist
- Belsy Laza (born 1967), Cuban former shot putter

== Plants ==
- Cyphostemma laza (also known as laza)
