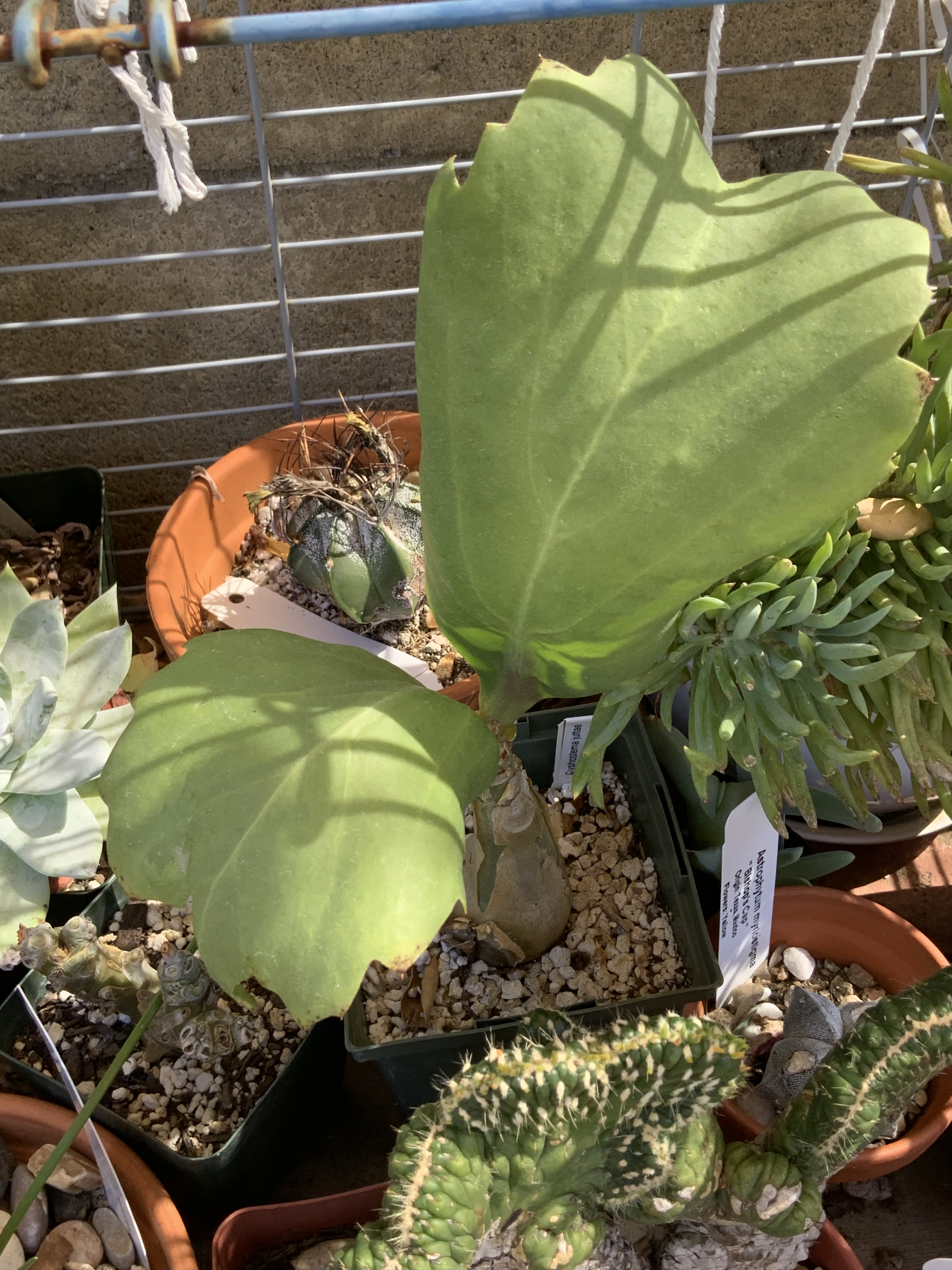

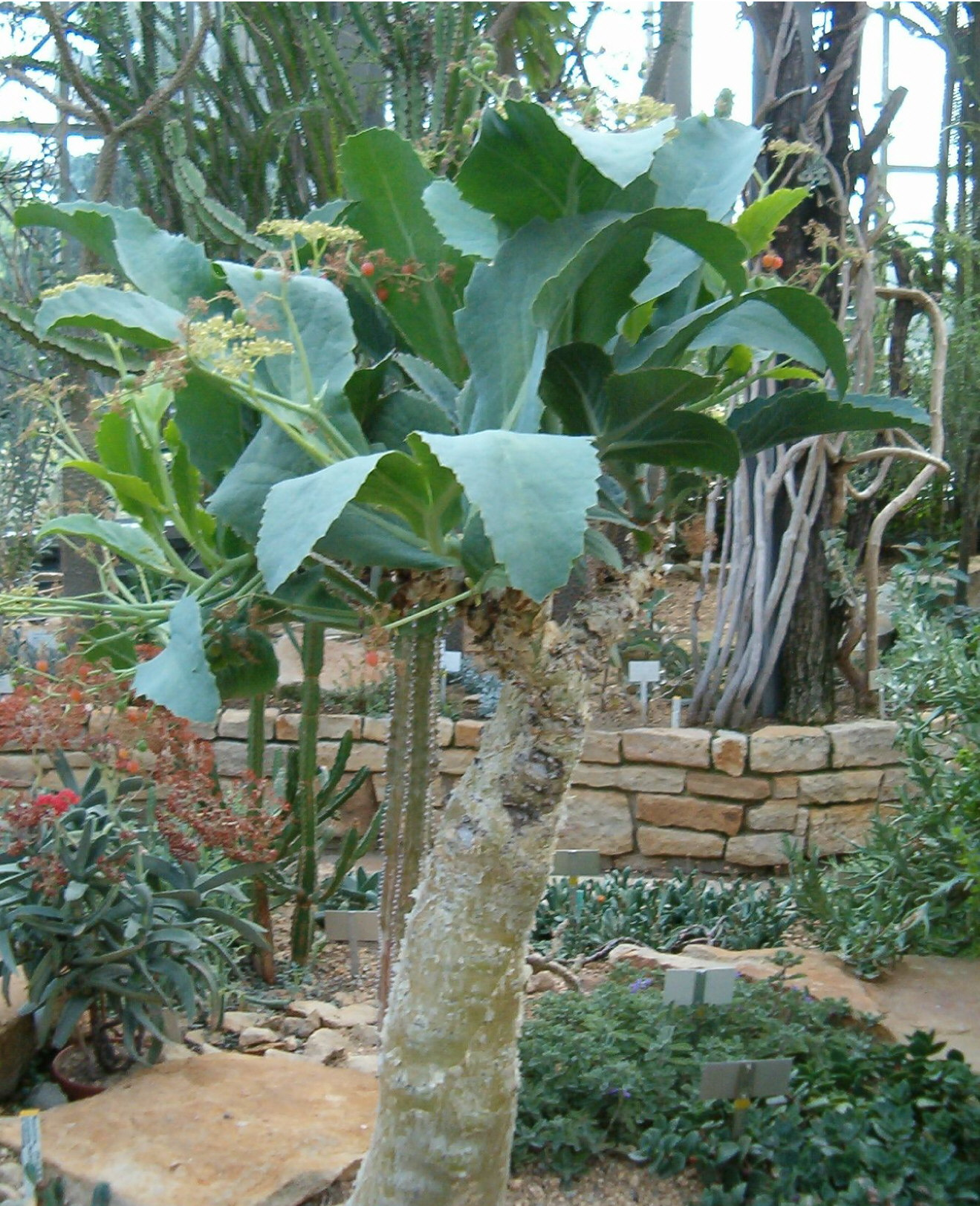
- At Berlin Botanical Garden, Germany.

Conservation status
- Least Concern (IUCN 3.1)

Scientific classification
- Kingdom: Plantae
- Clade: Tracheophytes
- Clade: Angiosperms
- Clade: Eudicots
- Clade: Rosids
- Order: Vitales
- Family: Vitaceae
- Genus: Cyphostemma
- Species: C. juttae

Binomial name
- Cyphostemma juttae (Dinter & Gilg) Desc.

Synonyms
- Cissus juttae Dinter & Gilg

= Cyphostemma juttae =

Species of succulent

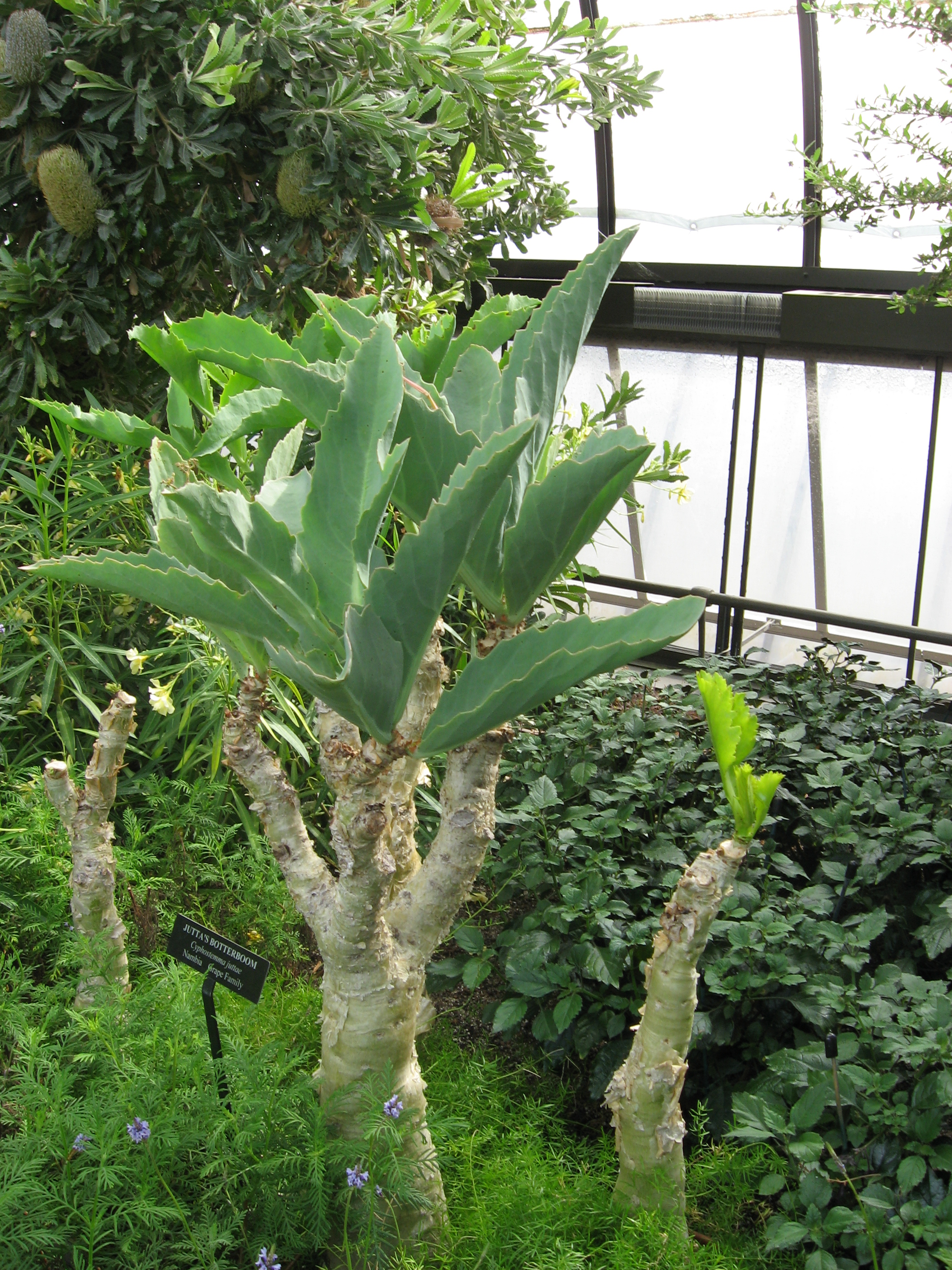
Jutta's botterboom

Cyphostemma juttae is a species of flowering plant in the genus Cyphostemma. It is a slow-growing succulent caudex shrub native to northwestern and north-central Namibia. It is well known as an ornamental plant.

The plant is also known as wild grape, tree grape, Namibian grape, droog-my-keel, Jutta's botterboom, and bastard cobas. The name "tree grape" comes from the grape-like fruits produced by the plant. These fruits are extremely poisonous, and should be avoided.

This species can reach 6 feet (1.8 metres) tall and has large shiny leaves. It is a deciduous plant. It grows in an arid region of summer-rainfall, and it loses its leaves in the dryer winter.

The species was first described as Cissus juttae by Kurt Dinter and Ernest Friedrich Gilg in 1912. In 1967 Bernard Marie Descoings placed the species in genus Cyphostemma as C. juttae.

== See also ==
- List of Southern African indigenous trees
- Kurt Dinter
