= Desc =

Desc or DESC may refer to:

- Descent
- Bernard Descoings (1931–2018), in botanist author citations (Desc.)
- Downtown Emergency Service Center, a non-profit organization serving the homeless community in Seattle
- Defense Electronics Supply Center, a former base now in the Defense Supply Center, Columbus
- Diplôme d'Etudes Spécialisées Complémentaires, a degree in the French medical system
