= Cyphostemma ternatum =

Scientific classification
- Kingdom: Plantae
- Clade: Tracheophytes
- Clade: Angiosperms
- Clade: Eudicots
- Clade: Rosids
- Order: Vitales
- Family: Vitaceae
- Genus: Cyphostemma
- Species: C. ternatum

Binomial name
- Cyphostemma ternatum Forssk. Desc.

Synonyms
- Cissus somalensis Glig.; Cissus ternata (Forssk.) J.F.Gmel; Saelantus ternatus Forssk.

Species of vine

Cyphostemma ternatum is a perennial climbing herb that grows up to 2m. It is edible and distributed throughout Northeast Africa to South Arabia. ternatum in Latin means "arranged in threes" and alludes to the arrangement of the leaves.

== Description ==
Cyphostemma ternatum is a succulent climbing vine up to 2m tall. Leaves alternate, simple and trifoliolate up to 25 cm long x 30 cm across. Leaves are serrated with a petiole up to 5 cm long. Flowers are pale greenish yellow, 2.5-3mm long; arranged opposite the leaves in umbellate cymes. Fruit is an ovoid or globose berry, 13 x 11mm, fleshy and ripens bright red.

== Habitat ==
Cyphostemma ternatum grows at near sea level and during the monsoon season. It can be found in bushland, grasslands riparian forests.

== Uses ==
Cyphostemma ternatum is edible and the leaves were traditionally boiled into a green mush in Southern Arabia. It has a peppery and acrid taste. The fruit of the C. ternatum is also edible once they have ripened, but only when the pip has been removed, as the pip is quite hot. The root is edible and can be eaten raw, but is apparently improved by cooking.

In traditional herbal medicine, this plant was used to treat cases of footrot in Arabia. A poultice of juice of the cooked leaves with salt was applied to the affected part.
