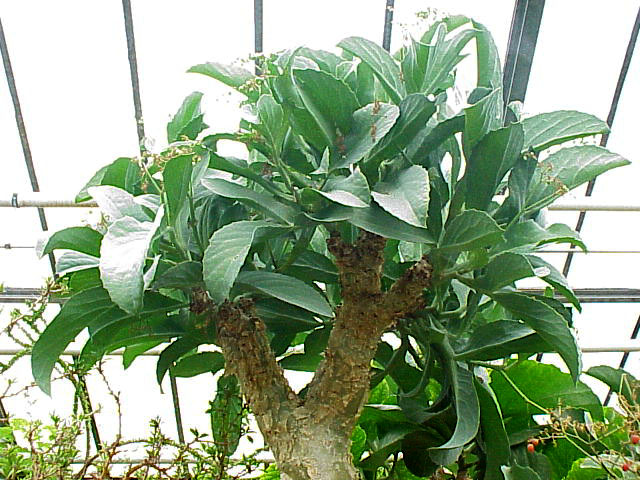

Scientific classification
- Kingdom: Plantae
- Clade: Tracheophytes
- Clade: Angiosperms
- Clade: Eudicots
- Clade: Rosids
- Order: Vitales
- Family: Vitaceae
- Genus: Cyphostemma
- Species: C. currorii

Binomial name
- Cyphostemma currorii (Hook. f.) Desc.

= Cyphostemma currorii =

Cobas tree

Species of vine

Cyphostemma currorii is a succulent tree belonging to the family Vitaceae, also known as Koba or Butter-tree. They grow and reach a height of 6 meters or more. Cyphostemma currorii is found in hot, arid rocky places, and has been seen from southern Angola to Namibia and is common on the Brandberg.

== Description ==
Cyphostemma currorii looks like a big succulent that grows up to be a tree, with creamy, papery peeling bark. The trunk has a yellowish to orange bark, peeling off in a paper-like flakes to expose a greenish underbark. They have very long trunks, they have mid vein with branches. The leaves are at the tip of the branches, arranged in groups of threes. The leaves are fairly large and fleshy; the edges of the leaves are not smooth. The leaves are dentated so they can preserve water so the tree can survive the extra hot seasons.

== Distribution ==
Cyphostemma currorii is found in hot, arid rocky places, and has been seen from southern Angola to Namibia and is common on the Brandberg.

== Use ==
This tree is not used for human consumption, as the foliage and fruit are rich in oxalic acid. The fruits are consumed by animals in its natural habitat. Due to its trunk ability to preserve water and be able to survive in dry, arid areas these trees are often used for landscape cultivation.

== Taxonomy ==
This species was named after Andrew B. Curror, a Royal Navy surgeon, from the vessel HMS Waterwitch, who first collected specimens of the tree at Elephant's Bay in Angola in the 1840s — the genus Curroria Planch. is also after him. The foliage and fruit of this genus are rich in oxalic acid, so that the leaves are shunned by browsers, though the fruit is relished by baboons and monkeys.

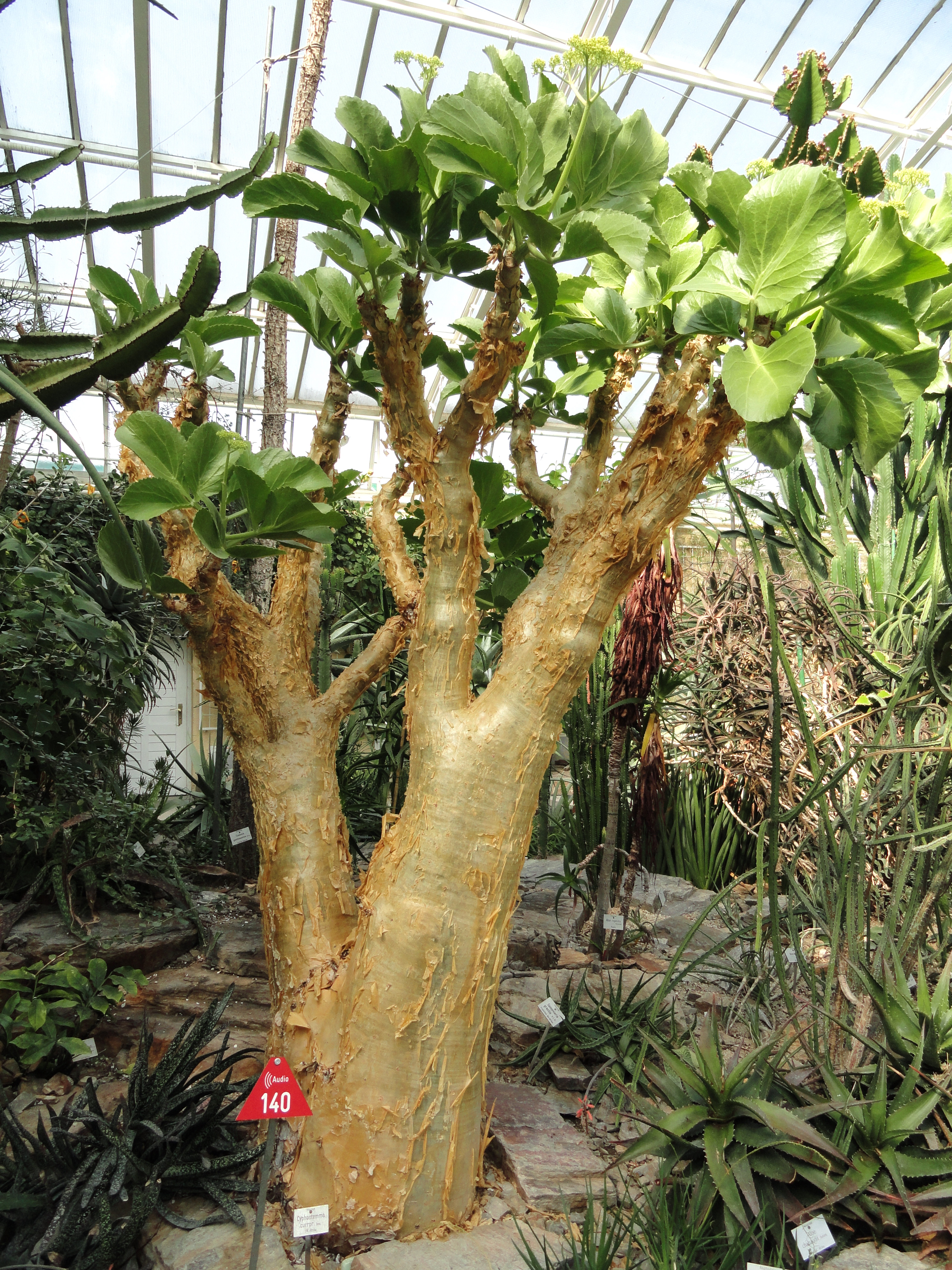
Cyphostemma currorii at the Botanischer Garten München-Nymphenburg.

== Sources ==
- Damaraland Flora - Christine Marais, Patricia Craven (Gamsberg McMillan 1992) ISBN 1-86848-784-9Caudiciforms
