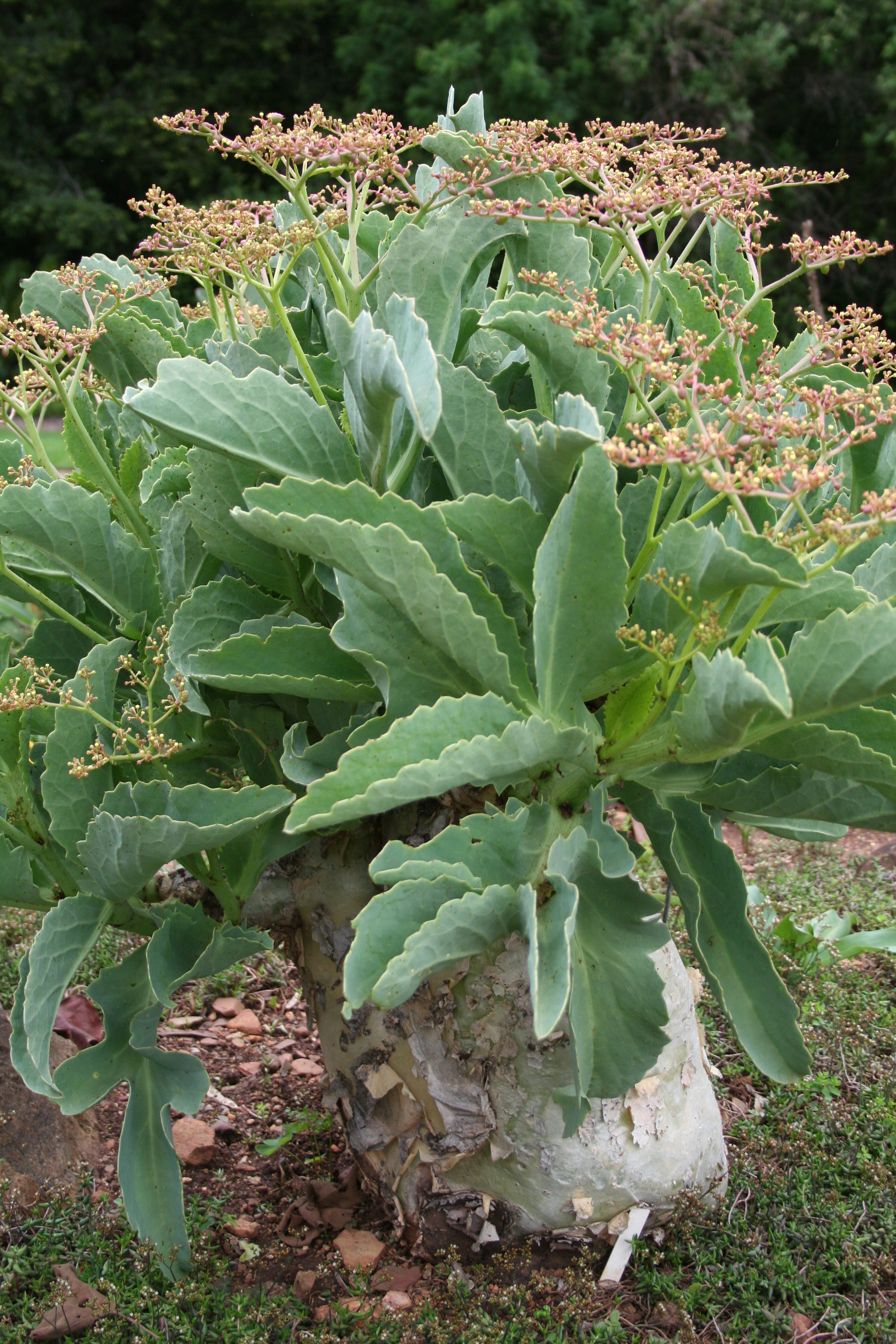
- Cyphostemma juttae

Scientific classification
- Kingdom: Plantae
- Clade: Tracheophytes
- Clade: Angiosperms
- Clade: Eudicots
- Clade: Rosids
- Order: Vitales
- Family: Vitaceae
- Tribe: Cayratieae
- Genus: Cyphostemma (Planch.) Alston

Species
- See text

Synonyms
- Cissus sect. Cyphostemma Planch. (basionym)

= Cyphostemma =

Genus of vines

Cyphostemma is a flowering plant genus in the family Vitaceae, with around 250 species distributed throughout the tropics and subtropics. These species are caudiciform and used to belong to the genus Cissus. The genus name comes from Greek kyphos, meaning hump, and stemma, meaning garland.

Within the Vitaceae, Cyphostemma is most closely related to Cayratia and Tetrastigma. All species of Cyphostemma were once included in the genus Cissus but are now considered to be distinct.

== Distribution ==
They originate from Northeast Africa to southern Arabia, in particular from Madagascar through to Indochina.

== Species ==
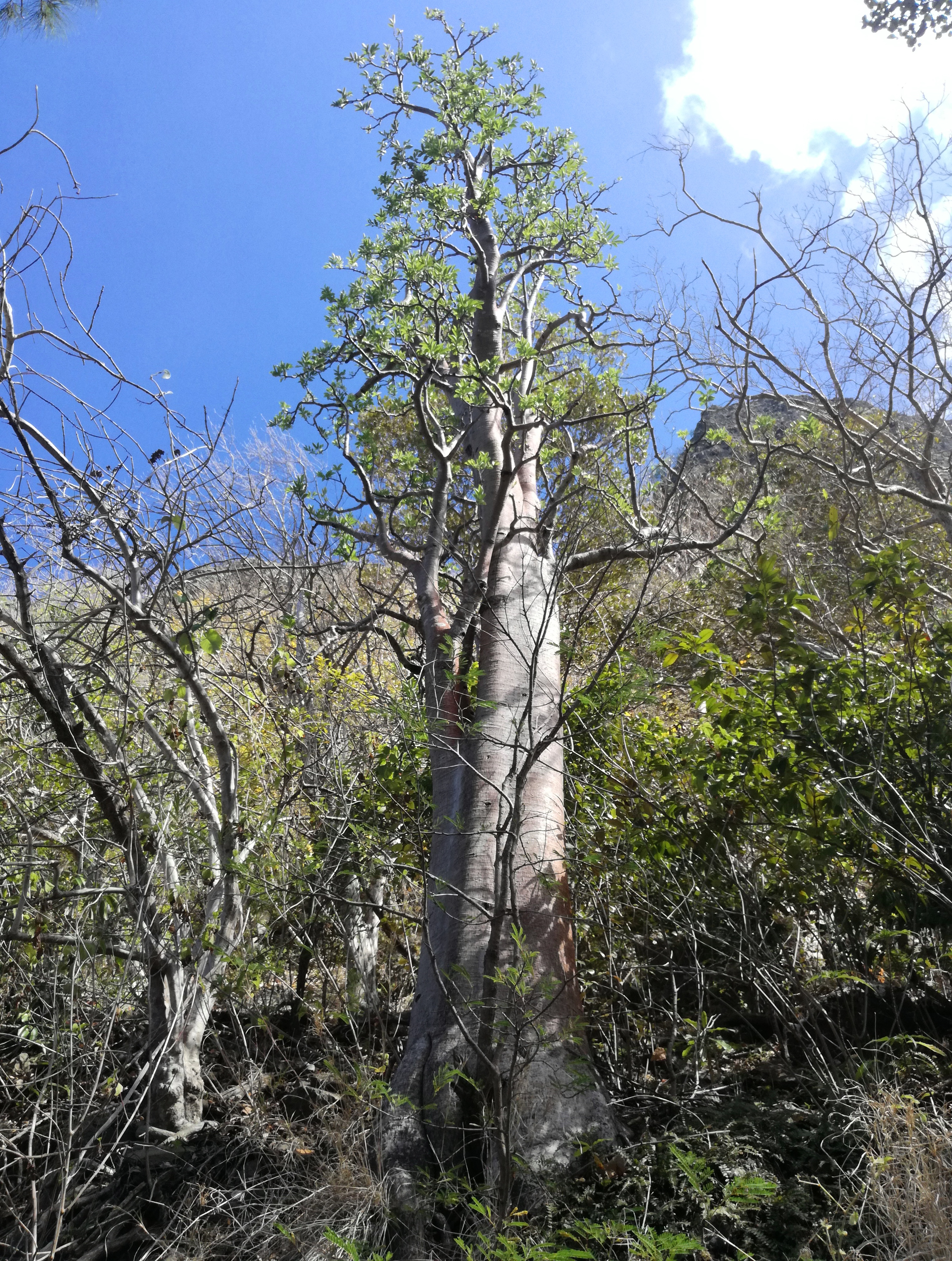
The largest species in the genus is the so-called "Mauritian baobab" (Cyphostemma mappia), a case of island gigantism.

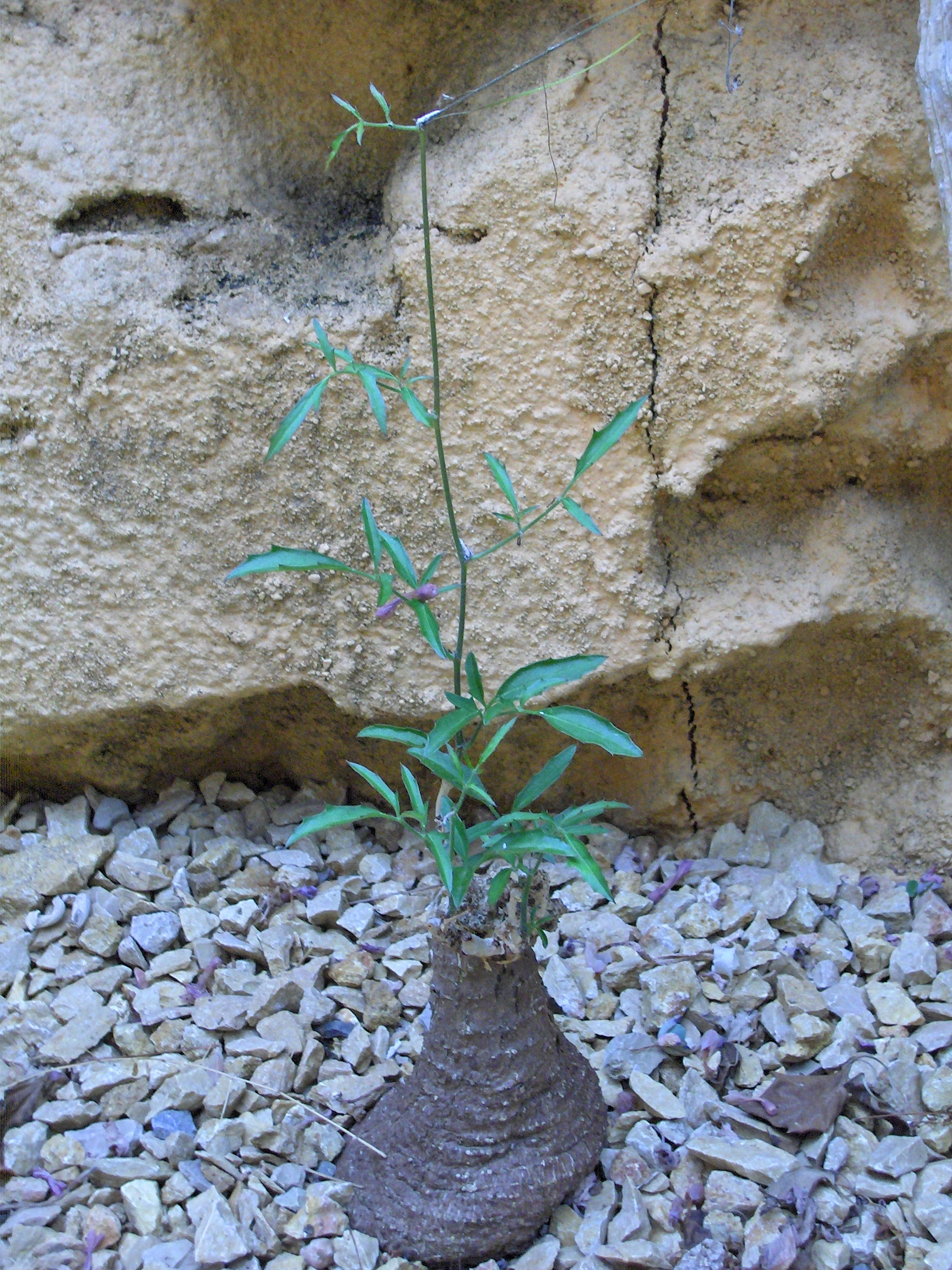
Cyphostemma elephantopus

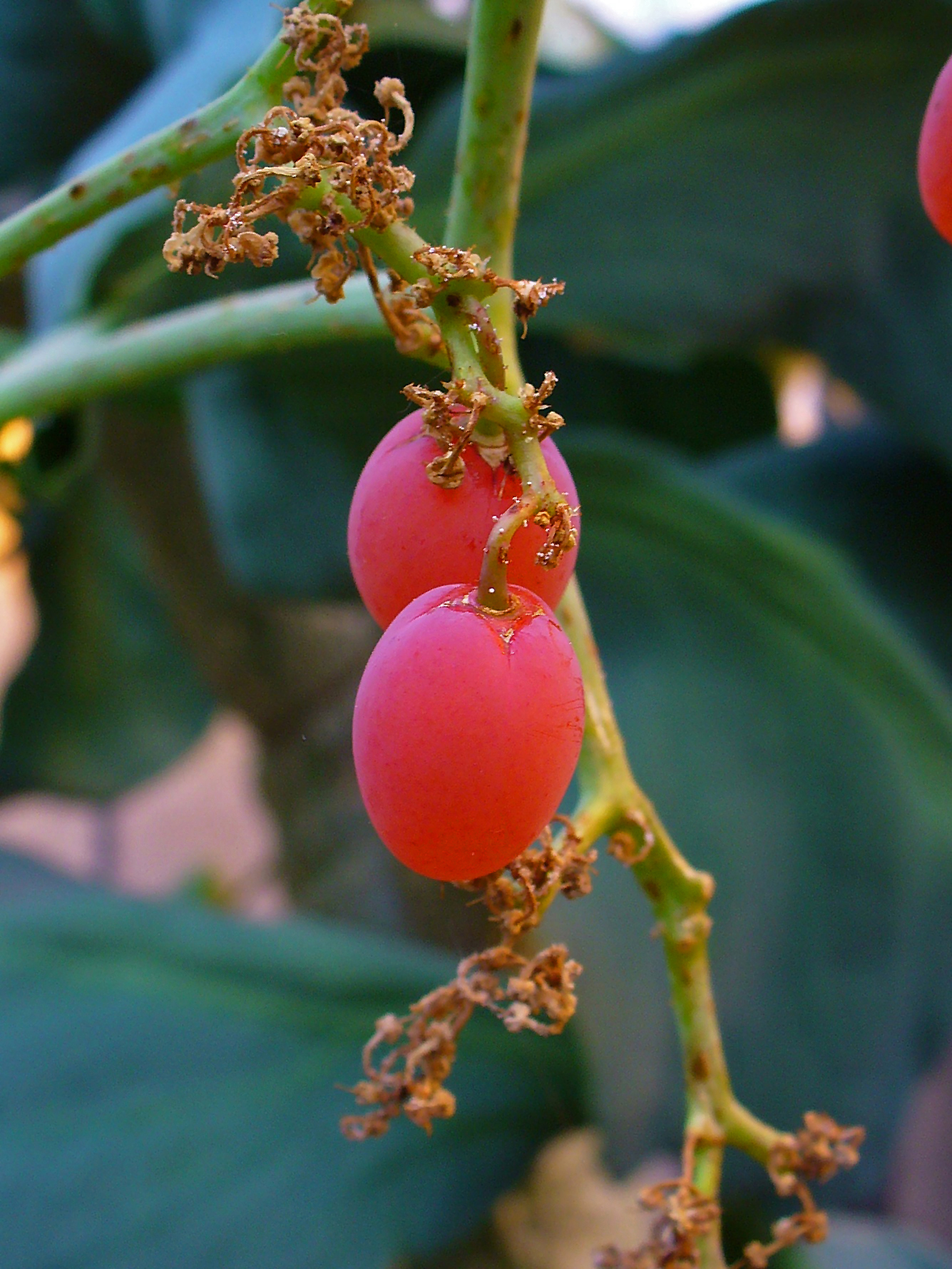
Cyphostemma berries, here on Cyphostemma bainesii

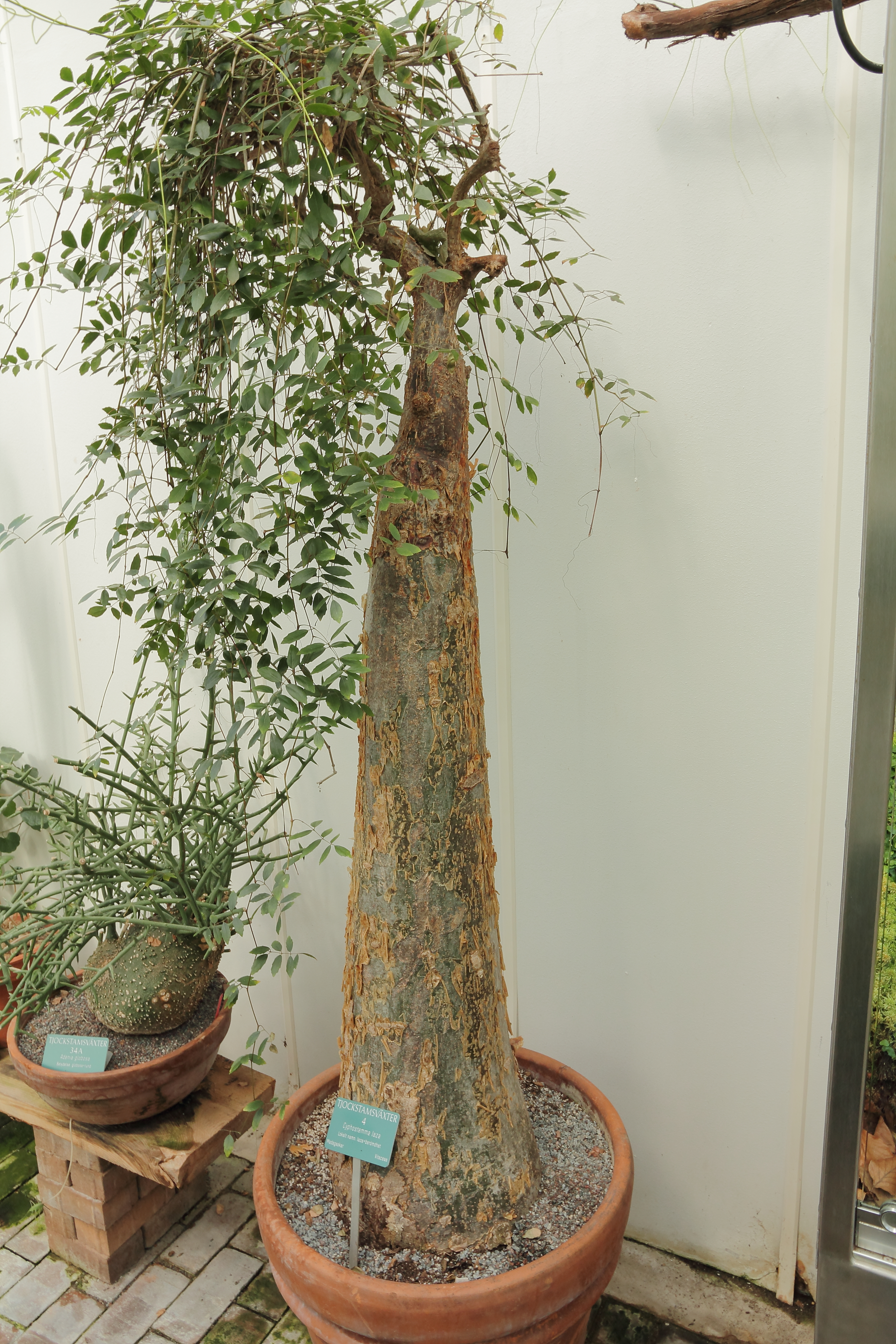
Cyphostemma laza in cultivation

As of December 2025, Plants of the World Online accepts the following 245 species:

- Cyphostemma abercornense Wild & R.B.Drumm.
- Cyphostemma adamii Desc.
- Cyphostemma adenanthum (Fresen.) Desc.
- Cyphostemma adenocarpum (Gilg & M.Brandt) Desc.
- Cyphostemma adenocaule (Steud. ex A.Rich.) Desc. ex Wild & R.B.Drumm.
- Cyphostemma adenopodum (Sprague) Desc.
- Cyphostemma allophylloides (Gilg & M.Brandt) Desc.
- Cyphostemma alnifolium (Schweinf. ex Planch.) Desc.
- Cyphostemma amplexicaule Desc.
- Cyphostemma anatomicum (C.A.Sm.) Wild & R.B.Drumm.
- Cyphostemma andavadoakense Rabarij. & L.M.Lu
- Cyphostemma ankaranense Desc.
- Cyphostemma ankirihitrense Desc.
- Cyphostemma auriculatum (Roxb.) P.Singh & B.V.Shetty
- Cyphostemma bainesii (Hook.) Desc.
- Cyphostemma bambuseti (Gilg & M.Brandt) Desc. ex Wild & R.B.Drumm.
- Cyphostemma barbosae Wild & R.B.Drumm.
- Cyphostemma betiforme (Chiov.) Vollesen
- Cyphostemma bidgoodiae Verdc.
- Cyphostemma biternatum (Baker) Desc.
- Cyphostemma boranense Vollesen
- Cyphostemma bororense (Klotzsch) Desc. ex Wild & R.B.Drumm.
- Cyphostemma braunii (Gilg & M.Brandt) Desc.
- Cyphostemma brieyi (De Wild.) Compère
- Cyphostemma buchananii (Planch.) Desc. ex Wild & R.B.Drumm.
- Cyphostemma bullatum (Gilg & M.Brandt) Desc.
- Cyphostemma burgeri Vollesen
- Cyphostemma cabui (Dewit) Desc.
- Cyphostemma caerulans Desc.
- Cyphostemma calcarium Rabarij. & L.M.Lu
- Cyphostemma camerounense Desc.
- Cyphostemma chloroleucum (Welw. ex Baker) Desc. ex Wild & R.B.Drumm.
- Cyphostemma chrysadenium (Gilg) Desc.
- Cyphostemma cirrhosum (Thunb.) Desc. ex Wild & R.B.Drumm.
- Cyphostemma comorense Desc.
- Cyphostemma congestum (Baker) Desc. ex Wild & R.B.Drumm.
- Cyphostemma congoense (Anon.) Desc.
- Cyphostemma cornigera Desc.
- Cyphostemma cornus-africani Thulin
- Cyphostemma crassiusculum (Baker) Desc.
- Cyphostemma crinitum (Planch.) Desc.
- Cyphostemma cristigera Desc.
- Cyphostemma crithmifolium (Chiov.) Desc.
- Cyphostemma crotalarioides (Planch.) Desc. ex Wild & R.B.Drumm.
- Cyphostemma cryptoglandulosum Verdc.
- Cyphostemma cuneatum (Gilg & M.Brandt) Desc.
- Cyphostemma currorii (Hook.f.) Desc.
- Cyphostemma curvipodum (Baker) Desc.
- Cyphostemma cymosum (Schumach. & Thonn.) Desc.
- Cyphostemma cyphopetalum (Fresen.) Desc. ex Wild & R.B.Drumm.
- Cyphostemma darainense Wahlert & Phillipson
- Cyphostemma dasycarpum Verdc.
- Cyphostemma dasypleurum (C.A.Sm.) J.J.M.van der Merwe
- Cyphostemma degraeri (Dewit) Desc.
- Cyphostemma dehongense L.M.Lu & V.C.Dang
- Cyphostemma delphinense Desc.
- Cyphostemma dembianense (Chiov.) Vollesen
- Cyphostemma descoingsii Lavie
- Cyphostemma desenfansii (Dewit) Desc.
- Cyphostemma dhufarense T.A.McCoy & Lavranos
- Cyphostemma digitatum (Lam.) Desc.
- Cyphostemma duparquettii (Planch.) Desc.
- Cyphostemma echinocarpum Desc.
- Cyphostemma elephantopus Desc.
- Cyphostemma elisabethvilleanum (Dewit) Desc. ex Wild & R.B.Drumm.
- Cyphostemma eminii (Gilg) Desc.
- Cyphostemma erythrocephalum (Gilg & M.Brandt) Desc.
- Cyphostemma feddeanum (Gilg & M.Brandt) Desc.
- Cyphostemma flavicans (Baker) Desc.
- Cyphostemma flaviflorum (Sprague) Desc.
- Cyphostemma fragariifolium (Bojer) Desc.
- Cyphostemma fugosioides (Gilg) Desc. ex Wild & R.B.Drumm.
- Cyphostemma gigantophyllum (Gilg & M.Brandt) Desc. ex Wild & R.B.Drumm.
- Cyphostemma gilletii (De Wild. & T.Durand) Desc.
- Cyphostemma glandulosissimum (Gilg & M.Brandt) Desc. ex Wild & R.B.Drumm.
- Cyphostemma glandulosopilosum Desc.
- Cyphostemma gracillimum (Werderm.) Desc.
- Cyphostemma grahamii Verdc.
- Cyphostemma grandistipulatum (Gilg & M.Brandt) Desc.
- Cyphostemma graniticum (Wild & R.B.Drumm.) Wild & R.B.Drumm.
- Cyphostemma greenwayi Verdc.
- Cyphostemma greveanum Desc.
- Cyphostemma griseorubrum (Gilg & M.Brandt) Desc.
- Cyphostemma hardyi Retief
- Cyphostemma haumanii (Dewit) Desc.
- Cyphostemma hereroense (Schinz) Desc. ex Wild & R.B.Drumm.
- Cyphostemma heterotrichum (Gilg & R.E.Fr.) Desc. ex Wild & R.B.Drumm.
- Cyphostemma hildebrandtii (Gilg) Desc. ex Wild & R.B.Drumm.
- Cyphostemma hispidiflorum (C.A.Sm.) J.J.M.van der Merwe
- Cyphostemma homblei (De Wild.) Desc.
- Cyphostemma horombense Desc.
- Cyphostemma huillense (Exell & Mendonça) Desc.
- Cyphostemma humile (N.E.Br.) Desc. ex Wild & R.B.Drumm.
- Cyphostemma hypoleucum (Harv.) Desc. ex Wild & R.B.Drumm.
- Cyphostemma jiguu Verdc.
- Cyphostemma johannis (Exell & Mendonça) Desc.
- Cyphostemma junceum (Webb) Desc. ex Wild & R.B.Drumm.
- Cyphostemma juttae (Dinter & Gilg) Desc.
- Cyphostemma kaniamae (Mullend. ex Dewit) Desc.
- Cyphostemma kapiriense (Dewit) Desc.
- Cyphostemma keilii (Gilg & M.Brandt) Desc.
- Cyphostemma kibweziense Verdc.
- Cyphostemma kilimandscharicum (Gilg) Desc. ex Wild & R.B.Drumm.
- Cyphostemma kirkianum (Planch.) Desc. ex Wild & R.B.Drumm.
- Cyphostemma kiwakishiense (Dewit) Desc.
- Cyphostemma knittelii (Gilg) Desc.
- Cyphostemma kundelunguense Malaisse
- Cyphostemma labatii Desc.
- Cyphostemma lageniflorum (Gilg & M.Brandt) Desc.
- Cyphostemma lanigerum (Harv.) Desc. ex Wild & R.B.Drumm.
- Cyphostemma laza Desc.
- Cyphostemma leandrii Desc.
- Cyphostemma ledermannii (Gilg & M.Brandt) Desc.
- Cyphostemma lelyi (Hutch.) Desc.
- Cyphostemma lentianum (Volkens & Gilg) Desc.
- Cyphostemma letouzeyanum Desc.
- Cyphostemma leucorufescens Desc.
- Cyphostemma leucotrichum (Gilg & M.Brandt) Desc.
- Cyphostemma libenii (Dewit) Desc.
- Cyphostemma lovemorei Wild & R.B.Drumm.
- Cyphostemma luteum (Exell & Mendonça) Desc.
- Cyphostemma lynesii (Dewit) Desc. ex Wild & R.B.Drumm.
- Cyphostemma macrocarpum Desc.
- Cyphostemma manambovensis Desc.
- Cyphostemma mandrakense Desc.
- Cyphostemma manikense (De Wild.) Desc. ex Wild & R.B.Drumm.
- Cyphostemma mannii (Baker) Desc.
- Cyphostemma mappia (Lam.) Galet
- Cyphostemma maranguense (Gilg) Desc.
- Cyphostemma marlothii (Dinter & Gilg) Desc.
- Cyphostemma marojejyense Desc.
- Cyphostemma marunguense (Dewit) Desc.
- Cyphostemma masukuense (Baker) Desc. ex Wild & R.B.Drumm.
- Cyphostemma megabotrys (Collett & Hemsl.) B.V.Shetty
- Cyphostemma mendesii F.Sousa
- Cyphostemma meyeri-johannis (Gilg & M.Brandt) Verdc.
- Cyphostemma michelii (Dewit) Desc.
- Cyphostemma micradenium (Gilg & M.Brandt) Desc.
- Cyphostemma microdipterum (Baker) Desc.
- Cyphostemma mildbraedii (Gilg & M.Brandt) Desc. ex Wild & R.B.Drumm.
- Cyphostemma milleri Wild & R.B.Drumm.
- Cyphostemma molle (Baker) Desc.
- Cyphostemma montagnacii Desc.
- Cyphostemma montanum Wild & R.B.Drumm.
- Cyphostemma muhuluense (Mildbr.) Desc.
- Cyphostemma nanellum (Gilg & R.E.Fr.) Desc. ex Wild & R.B.Drumm.
- Cyphostemma natalitium (Szyszył.) J.J.M.van der Merwe
- Cyphostemma nigroglandulosum (Gilg & M.Brandt) Desc.
- Cyphostemma niveum (Hochst. ex Schweinf.) Desc.
- Cyphostemma njegerre (Gilg) Desc.
- Cyphostemma obovato-oblongum (De Wild.) Desc. ex Wild & R.B.Drumm.
- Cyphostemma odontadenium (Gilg) Desc.
- Cyphostemma oleraceum (Bolus) J.J.M.van der Merwe
- Cyphostemma omburense (Gilg & M.Brandt) Desc.
- Cyphostemma ornatum (A.Chev. ex Hutch. & Dalziel) Desc.
- Cyphostemma ouakense Desc.
- Cyphostemma overlaetii (Dewit) Desc.
- Cyphostemma oxyphyllum (A.Rich.) Vollesen
- Cyphostemma pachyanthum (Gilg & M.Brandt) Desc.
- Cyphostemma pachypus Desc.
- Cyphostemma pannosum Vollesen
- Cyphostemma passargei (Gilg & M.Brandt) Desc.
- Cyphostemma paucidentatum (Klotzsch) Desc. ex Wild & R.B.Drumm.
- Cyphostemma pendulum (Welw. ex Baker) Desc.
- Cyphostemma perforatum (Louis ex Dewit) Desc.
- Cyphostemma pobeguinianum Desc.
- Cyphostemma princeae (Gilg & M.Brandt) Desc. ex Wild & R.B.Drumm.
- Cyphostemma pruriens (Welw. ex Baker) Desc.
- Cyphostemma pseudoburgeri Verdc.
- Cyphostemma pseudonjegerre (Gilg & M.Brandt) Desc.
- Cyphostemma pseudorhodesiae (Dewit) Desc.
- Cyphostemma pseudosesquipedale Verdc.
- Cyphostemma pseudoupembaense (Dewit) Desc.
- Cyphostemma puberulum (C.A.Sm.) Wild & R.B.Drumm.
- Cyphostemma pumilum Desc.
- Cyphostemma quinatum (Dryand.) Desc. ex Wild & R.B.Drumm.
- Cyphostemma rhodesiae (Gilg & M.Brandt) Desc. ex Wild & R.B.Drumm.
- Cyphostemma richardsiae Wild & R.B.Drumm.
- Cyphostemma rivae (Gilg) Desc.
- Cyphostemma robsonii Wild & R.B.Drumm.
- Cyphostemma robynsii (Dewit) Desc.
- Cyphostemma roseiglandulosum Desc.
- Cyphostemma rotundistipulatum Wild & R.B.Drumm.
- Cyphostemma ruacanense (Exell & Mendonça) Desc.
- Cyphostemma rubroglandulosum Retief & A.E.van Wyk
- Cyphostemma rubromarginatum (Gilg & M.Brandt) Desc.
- Cyphostemma rubrosetosum (Gilg & M.Brandt) Desc.
- Cyphostemma rupicola (Gilg & M.Brandt) Desc.
- Cyphostemma rutilans Desc.
- Cyphostemma sakalavense Desc.
- Cyphostemma sambiranense Rabarij. & L.M.Lu
- Cyphostemma sanctuarium-selousii Verdc.
- Cyphostemma sarcospathulum (Chiov.) Desc.
- Cyphostemma saxicola (Gilg & R.E.Fr.) Desc. ex Wild & R.B.Drumm.
- Cyphostemma schimperi (Hochst. ex A.Rich.) Desc.
- Cyphostemma schlechteri (Gilg & M.Brandt) Desc. ex Wild & R.B.Drumm.
- Cyphostemma schliebenii (Mildbr.) Desc.
- Cyphostemma segmentatum (C.A.Sm.) J.J.M.van der Merwe
- Cyphostemma seitzianum (Gilg & M.Brandt) Desc.
- Cyphostemma serpens (Hochst. ex A.Rich.) Desc.
- Cyphostemma sessilifolium (Dewit) Desc.
- Cyphostemma setosum (Roxb.) Alston
- Cyphostemma shinyangense Verdc.
- Cyphostemma simplicifolium A.Bjørnstad
- Cyphostemma simulans (C.A.Sm.) Wild & R.B.Drumm.
- Cyphostemma sokodense (Gilg & M.Brandt) Desc.
- Cyphostemma spinosopilosum (Gilg & M.Brandt) Desc.
- Cyphostemma stefanianum (Chiov.) Desc.
- Cyphostemma stegosaurus Verdc.
- Cyphostemma stenolobum (Welw. ex Baker) Desc. ex Wild & R.B.Drumm.
- Cyphostemma stipulaceum (Baker) Desc.
- Cyphostemma strigosum (Dewit) Desc.
- Cyphostemma subciliatum (Baker) Desc. ex Wild & R.B.Drumm.
- Cyphostemma sulcatum (C.A.Sm.) J.J.M.van der Merwe
- Cyphostemma taborense Verdc.
- Cyphostemma tenuissimum (Gilg & R.E.Fr.) Desc. ex Wild & R.B.Drumm.
- Cyphostemma ternatum (J.F.Gmel.) Desc.
- Cyphostemma thomasii (Gilg & M.Brandt) Desc.
- Cyphostemma tisserantii Desc.
- Cyphostemma trachyphyllum (Werderm.) Desc. ex Wild & R.B.Drumm.
- Cyphostemma trilobatum (Lam.) M.R.Almeida
- Cyphostemma tsaratananensis Desc.
- Cyphostemma ukerewense (Gilg) Desc.
- Cyphostemma urophyllum (Gilg & M.Brandt) Desc.
- Cyphostemma uter (Exell & Mendonça) Desc.
- Cyphostemma uwanda Verdc.
- Cyphostemma vandenbergheae Malaisse & Matamba
- Cyphostemma vandenbrandeanum (Dewit) Desc. ex Wild & R.B.Drumm.
- Cyphostemma vanderbenii (Dewit) Desc.
- Cyphostemma vanmeelii (Lawalrée) Wild & R.B.Drumm.
- Cyphostemma vezensis Desc.
- Cyphostemma villosicaule Verdc.
- Cyphostemma villosum Rabarij. & L.M.Lu
- Cyphostemma violaceoglandulosum (Gilg) Desc.
- Cyphostemma viscosum (Gilg & R.E.Fr.) Desc. ex Wild & R.B.Drumm.
- Cyphostemma vogelii (Hook.f.) Desc.
- Cyphostemma vollesenii Verdc.
- Cyphostemma waterlotii (A.Chev.) Desc.
- Cyphostemma wilmsii (Gilg & M.Brandt) Desc.
- Cyphostemma wittei (Staner) Wild & R.B.Drumm.
- Cyphostemma woodii (Gilg & M.Brandt) Desc.
- Cyphostemma zanzibaricum Verdc.
- Cyphostemma zechianum (Gilg & M.Brandt) Desc.
- Cyphostemma zimmermannii Verdc.
- Cyphostemma zombense (Baker) Desc. ex Wild & R.B.Drumm.

== Gallery ==
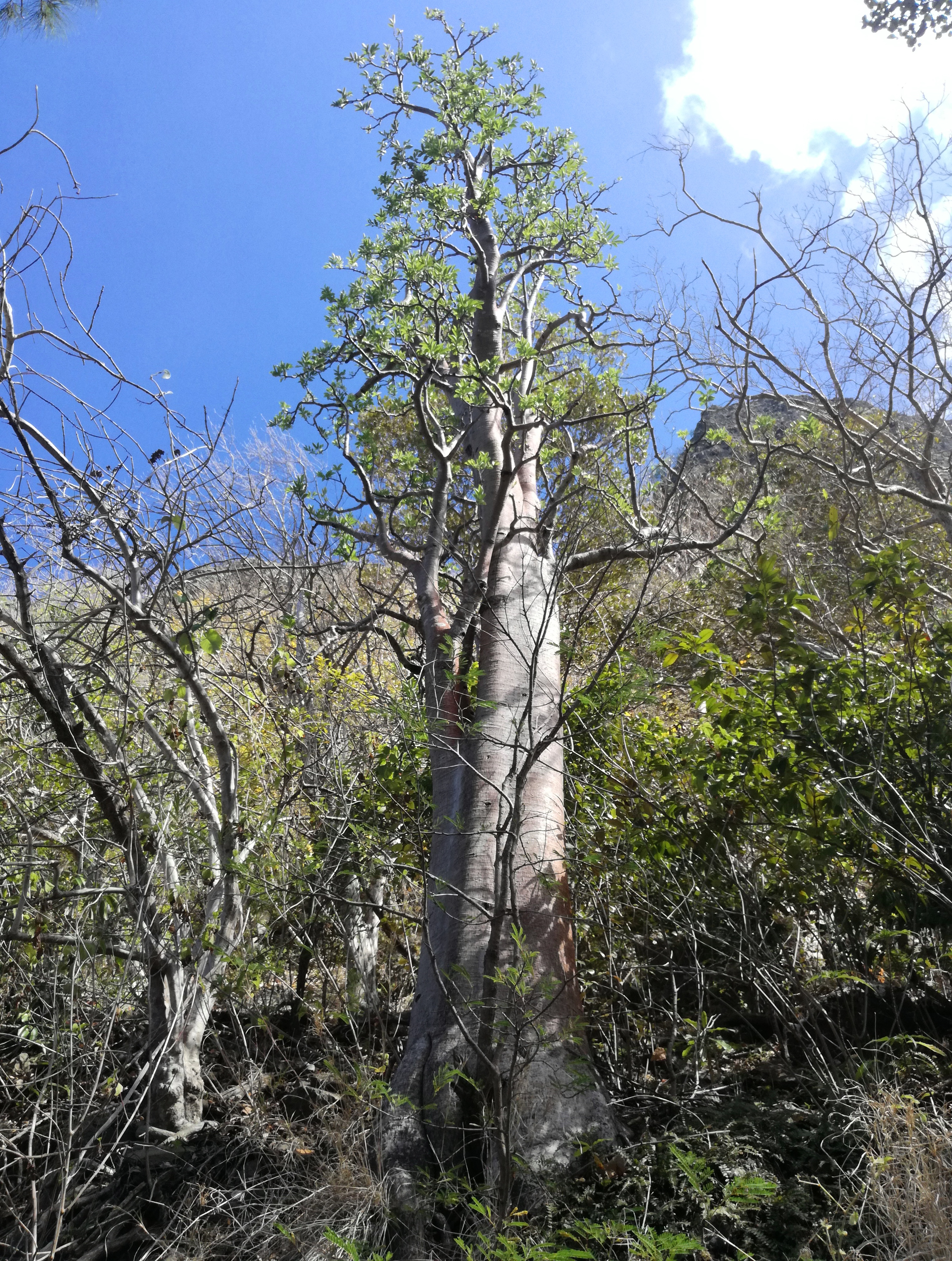
Cyphostemma mappia (Mauritian baobab)

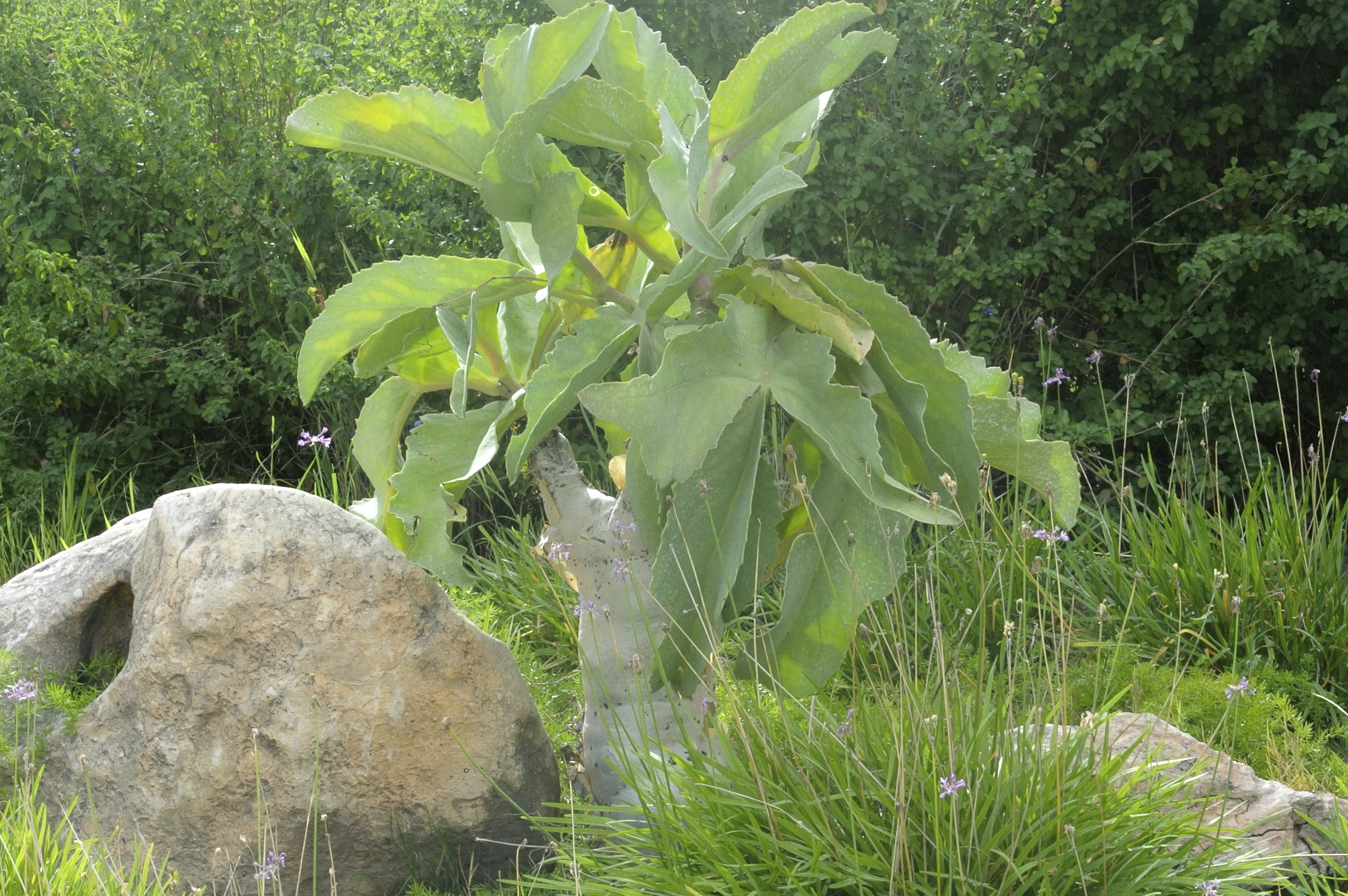
Cyphostemma juttae (Jutta's botterboom)

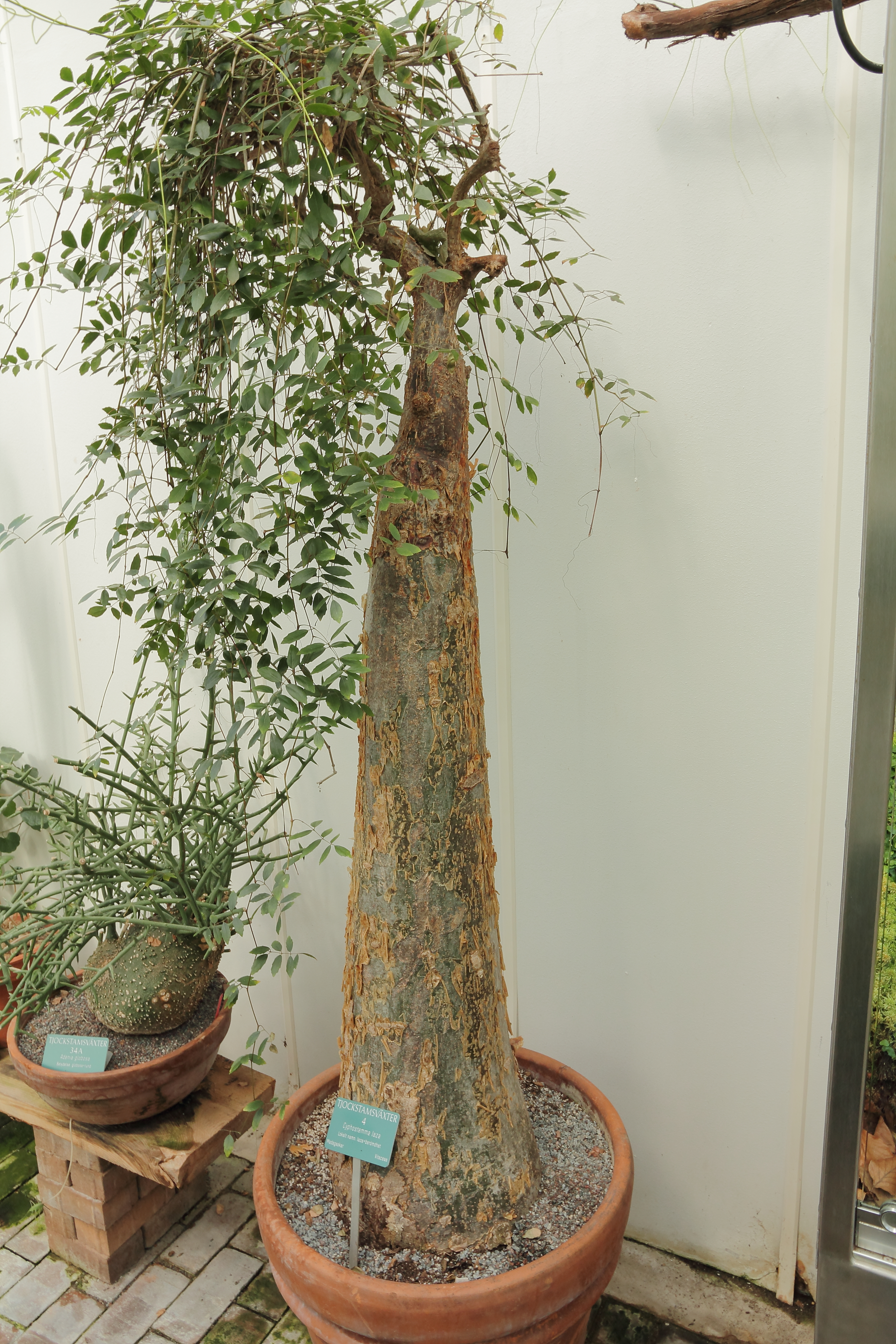
Cyphostemma laza (Laza)

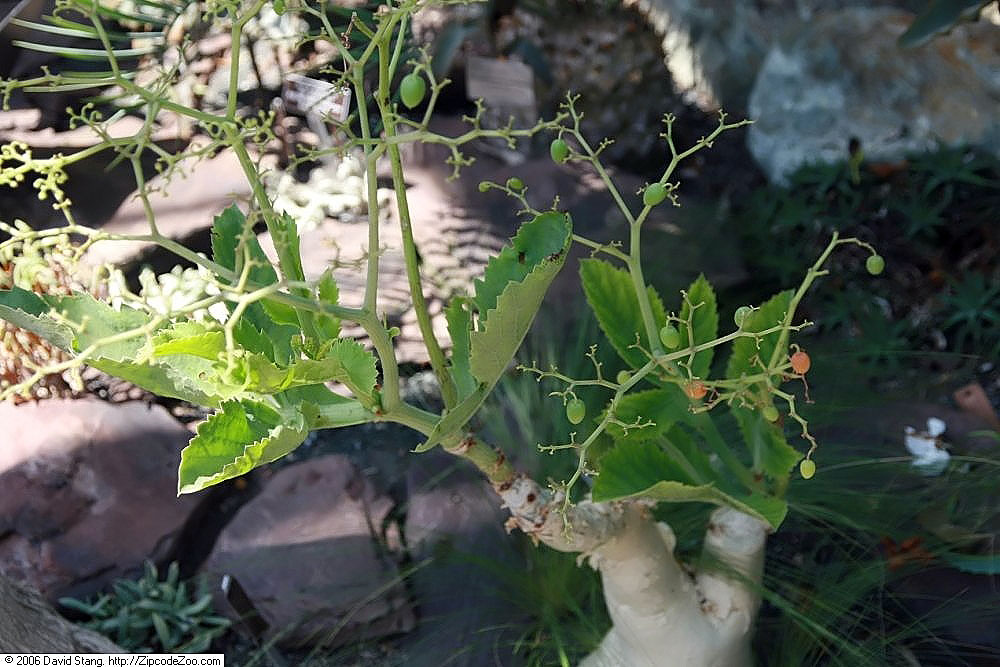
Cyphostemma bainesii (Baines' grape)

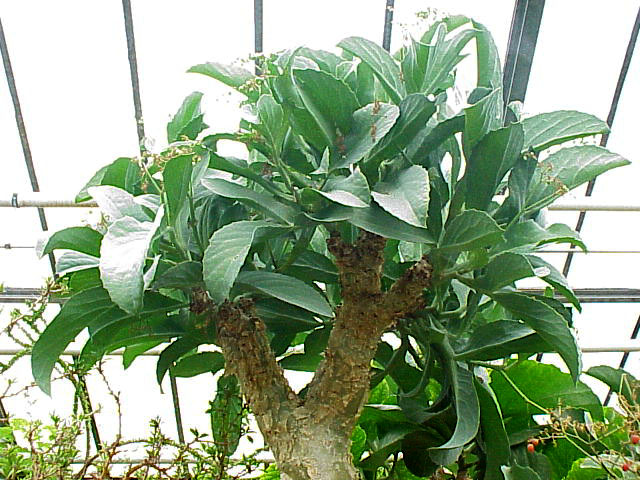
Cyphostemma currorii (Butter-tree)

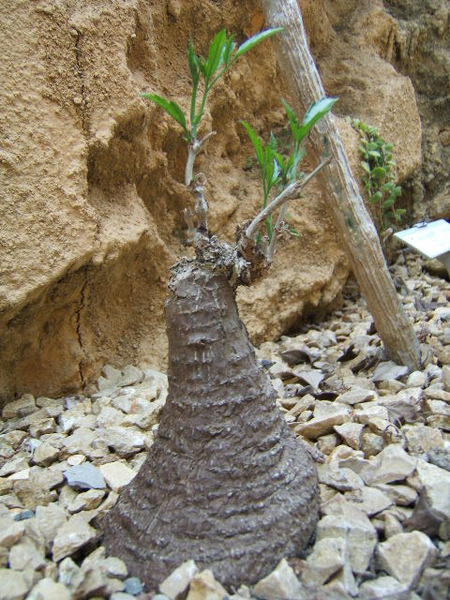
Cyphostemma elephantopus (Elephant tree)

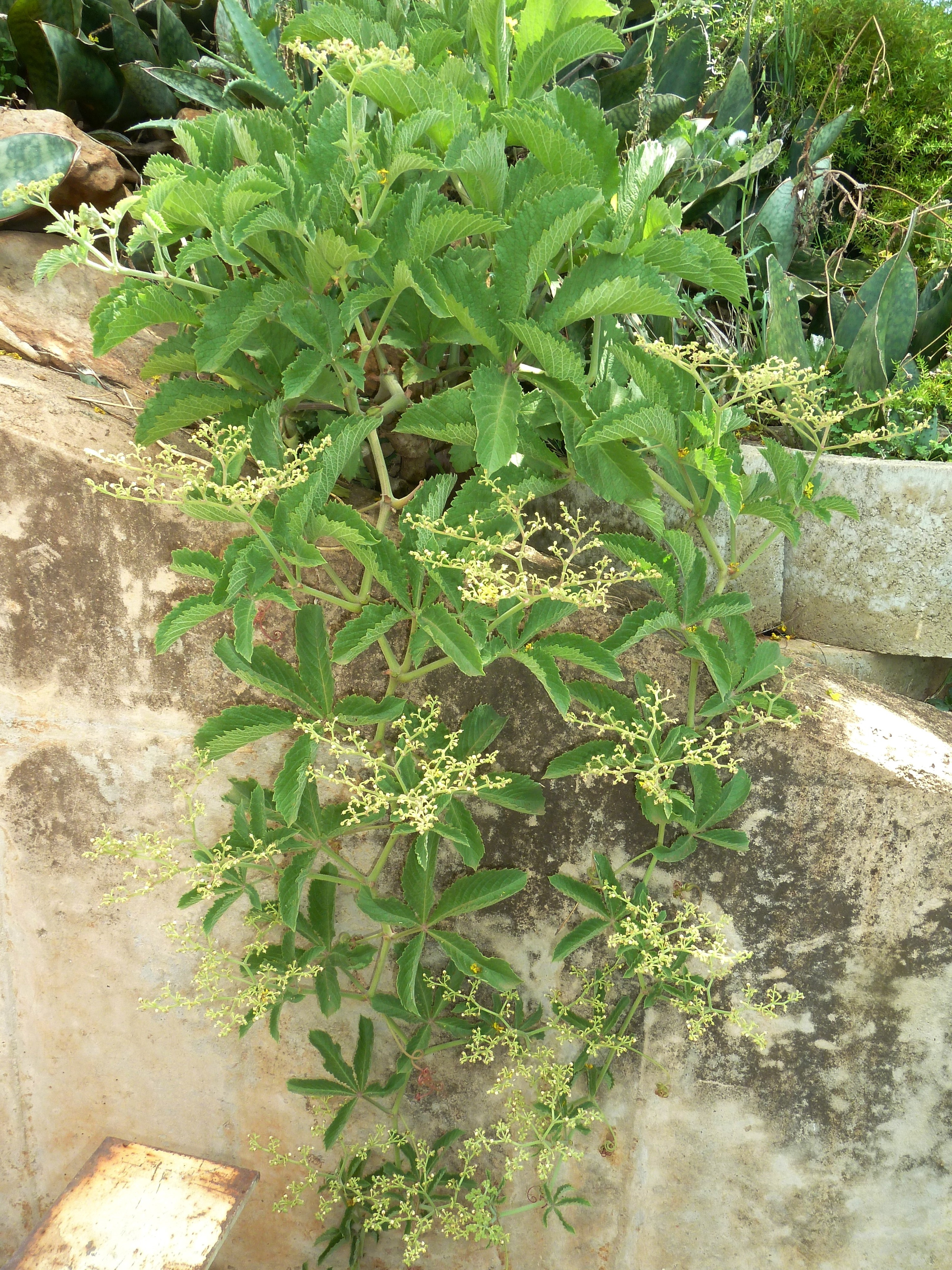
Cyphostemma lanigerium (Five-leaf Cyphostemma)

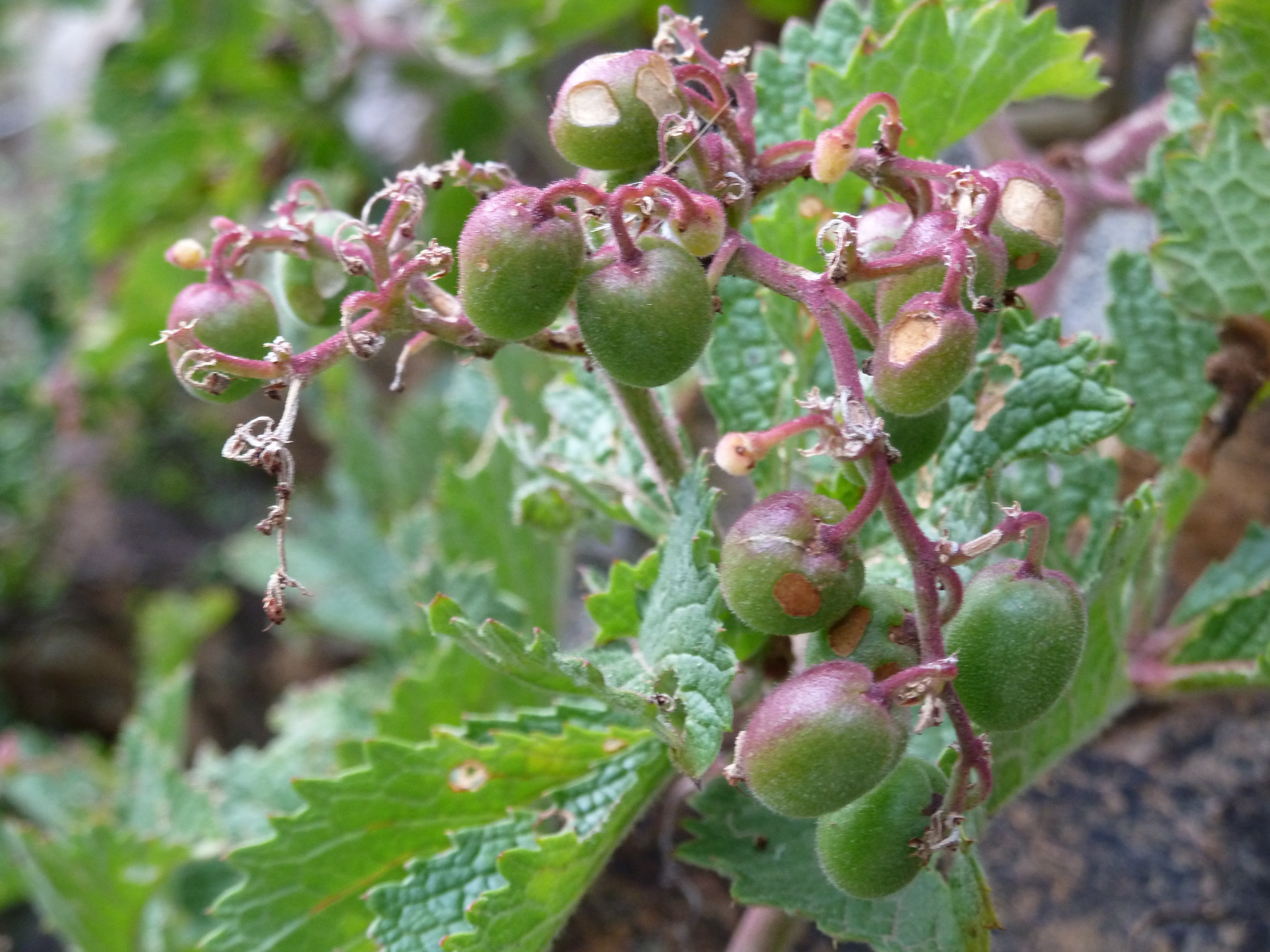
Cyphostemma cirrhosum (Dwarf five-leaf)

== See also ==
- Cissus
- Vitis
- Ampelocissus
