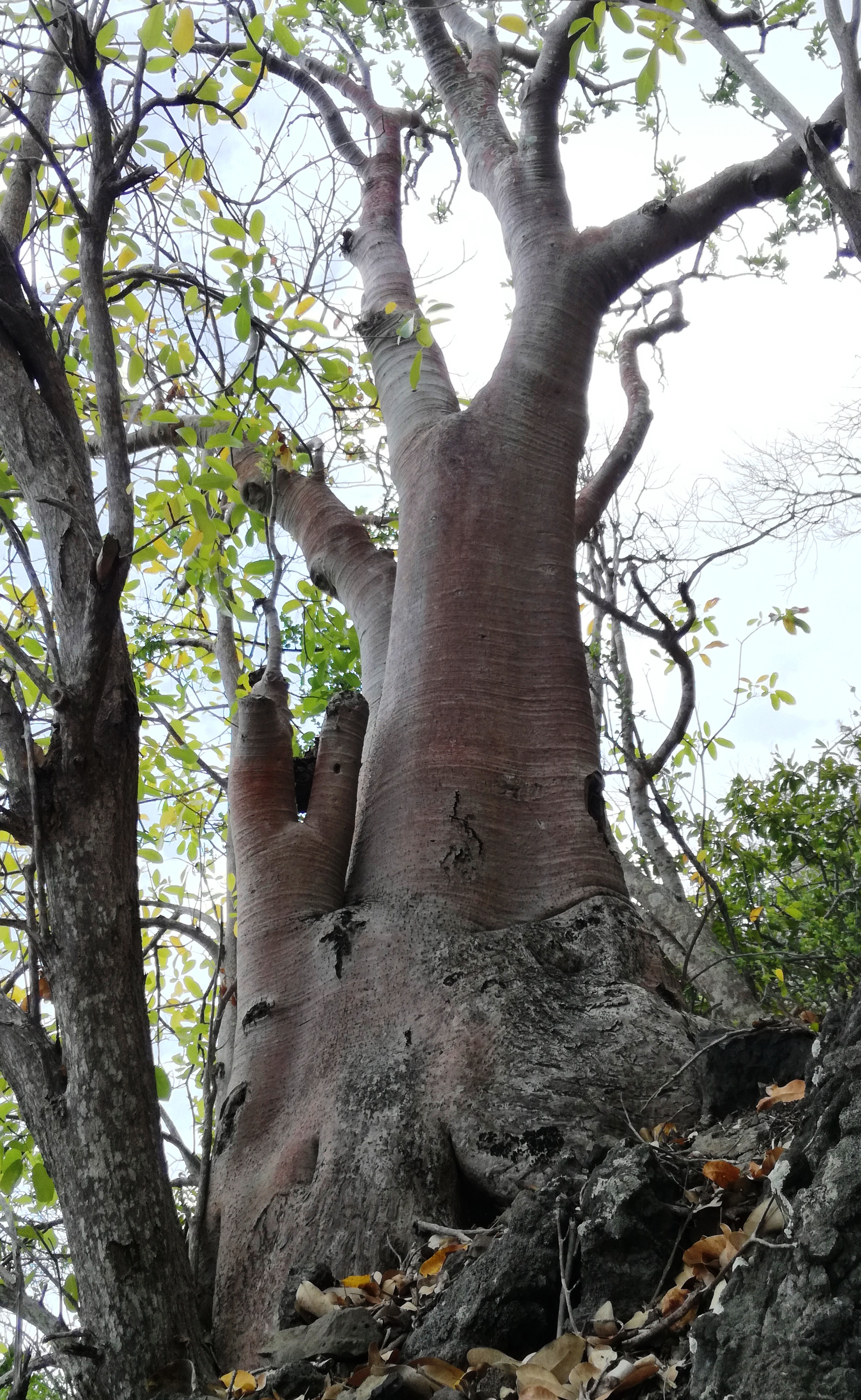
- Adult Mapou tree, in its Mauritius habitat.

Conservation status
- Endangered (IUCN 3.1)

Scientific classification
- Kingdom: Plantae
- Clade: Tracheophytes
- Clade: Angiosperms
- Clade: Eudicots
- Clade: Rosids
- Order: Vitales
- Family: Vitaceae
- Genus: Cyphostemma
- Species: C. mappia

Binomial name
- Cyphostemma mappia (Lam.) Galet

Synonyms
- Vitis mappia; Cissus mappia

= Cyphostemma mappia =

Species of vine

Cyphostemma mappia (Mapou tree or bois mapou) is a species of caudiciform succulent plant endemic to Mauritius. It is sometimes known as the "Mauritian baobab", though it is a member of the grape family (Vitaceae) and unrelated to the true Baobabs of Africa.

This species is endangered, but is beginning to be propagated in its native Mauritius, as an ornamental landscaping plant.

== Description ==
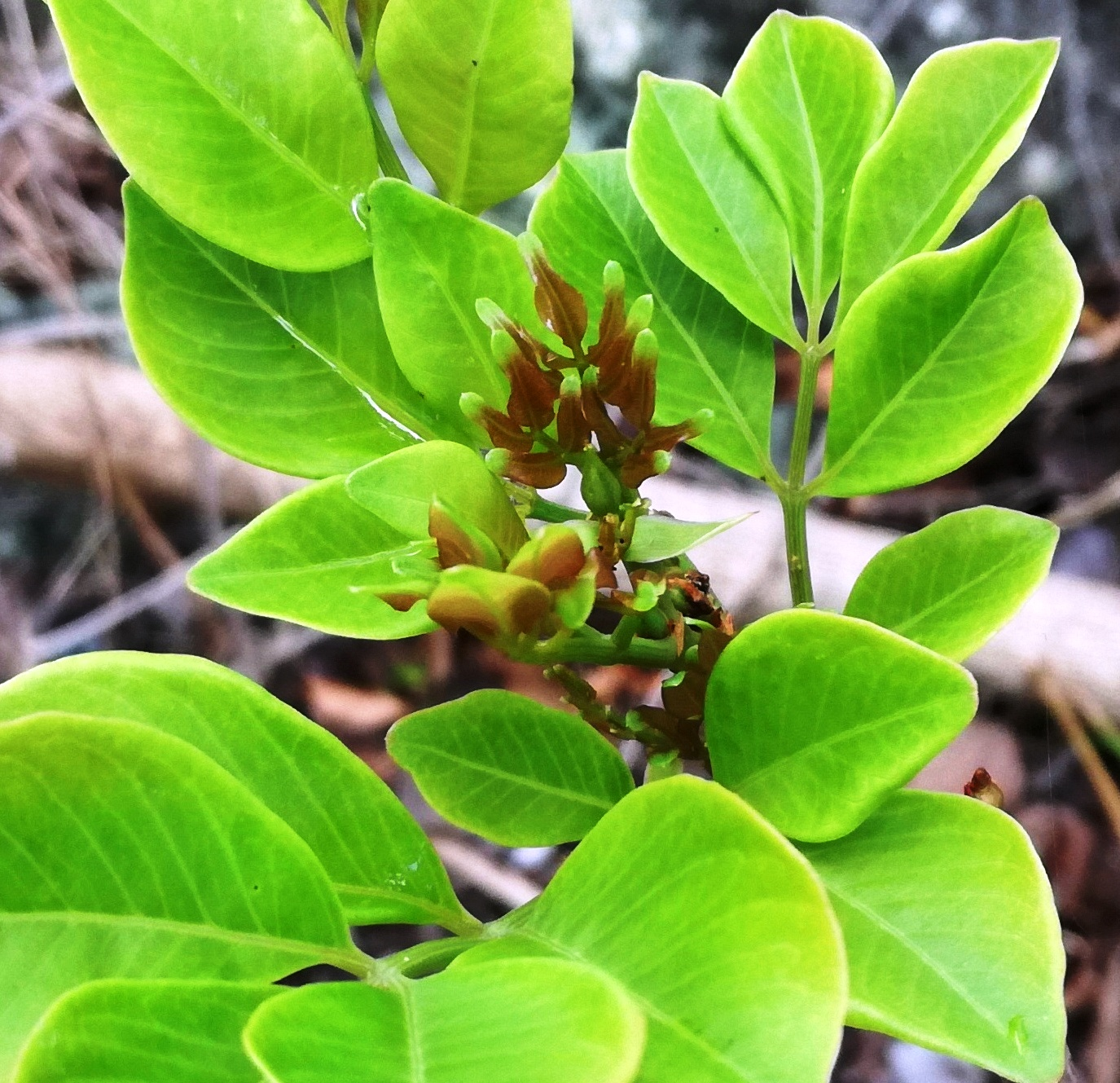
Detail of foliage in a mature plant

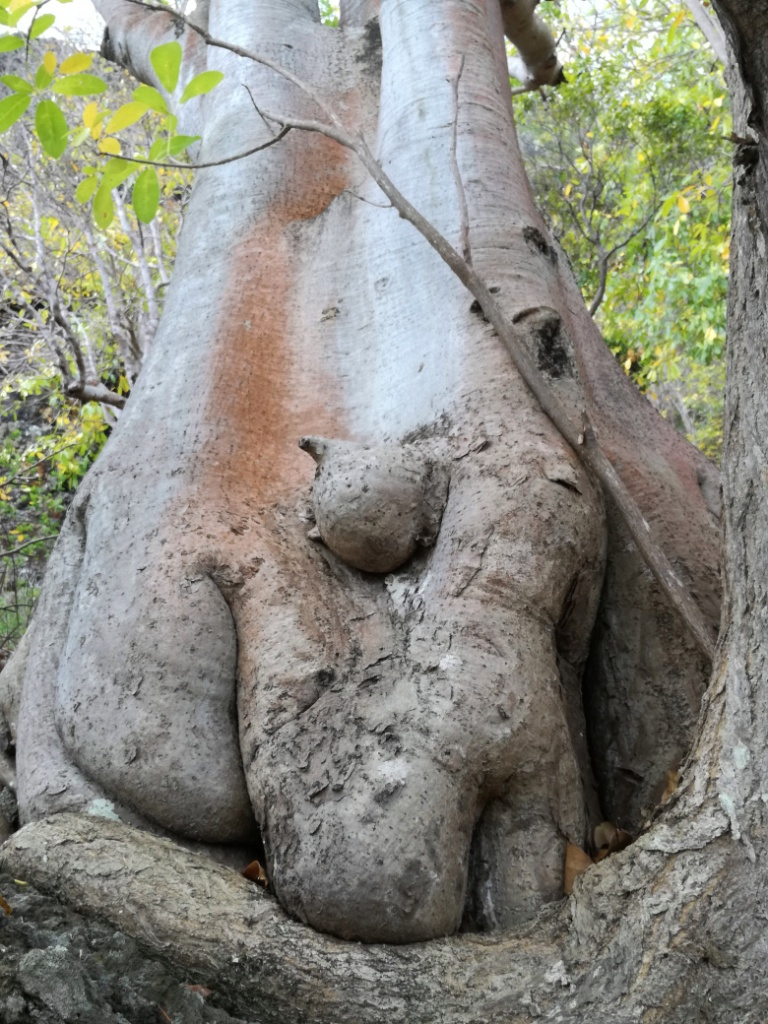
The swollen, water-filled trunk of an adult Mapou tree.

It is a soft-stemmed caudiciform tree, with succulent green leaves on fragile, chunky, elastic, distinctively zig-zag branches. It can eventually reach a height of nearly 10 meters, and develop a vastly expanded, swollen, water-filled trunk. This means that it can resemble a baobab in shape.

As a case of "island gigantism", it is the only Cyphostemma species to attain the size of a large tree. It has also lost the vine-like tendrils of its genus, which falls within the greater Vitaceae (grapevine) family.

In exposed areas, it tends to be shorter and more robust - only a few meters tall. In more protected environments, it grows up to ten meters in height. The wood is soft and fleshy, like that of a true baobab. It is therefore sometimes confused both with the baobab (Adansonia digitata) or with the genera Calpidia or Pisonia which all have similar fleshy trunks.

It produces flowers from January through May and sometimes they remain for as long as October. The fruits are small, red, velvety grapes.

Like many other endemic Mauritian plants, it has heterophyllous leaves, due to having evolved with the presence of grazing giant tortoises. The plants still exhibit this heterophylly, even though the Cylindraspis giant tortoise species of Mauritius are now extinct. Leaves of young plants are longer, thinner and lighter red-coloured - and are mostly ignored by tortoises. In older plants, where the leaves are out of reach of giant tortoises, the leaves are larger, broader and greener. The leaves are compound, with odd numbers of leaflet segments, and it is typically deciduous.

=== Changes in leaf form (Heterophylly) ===
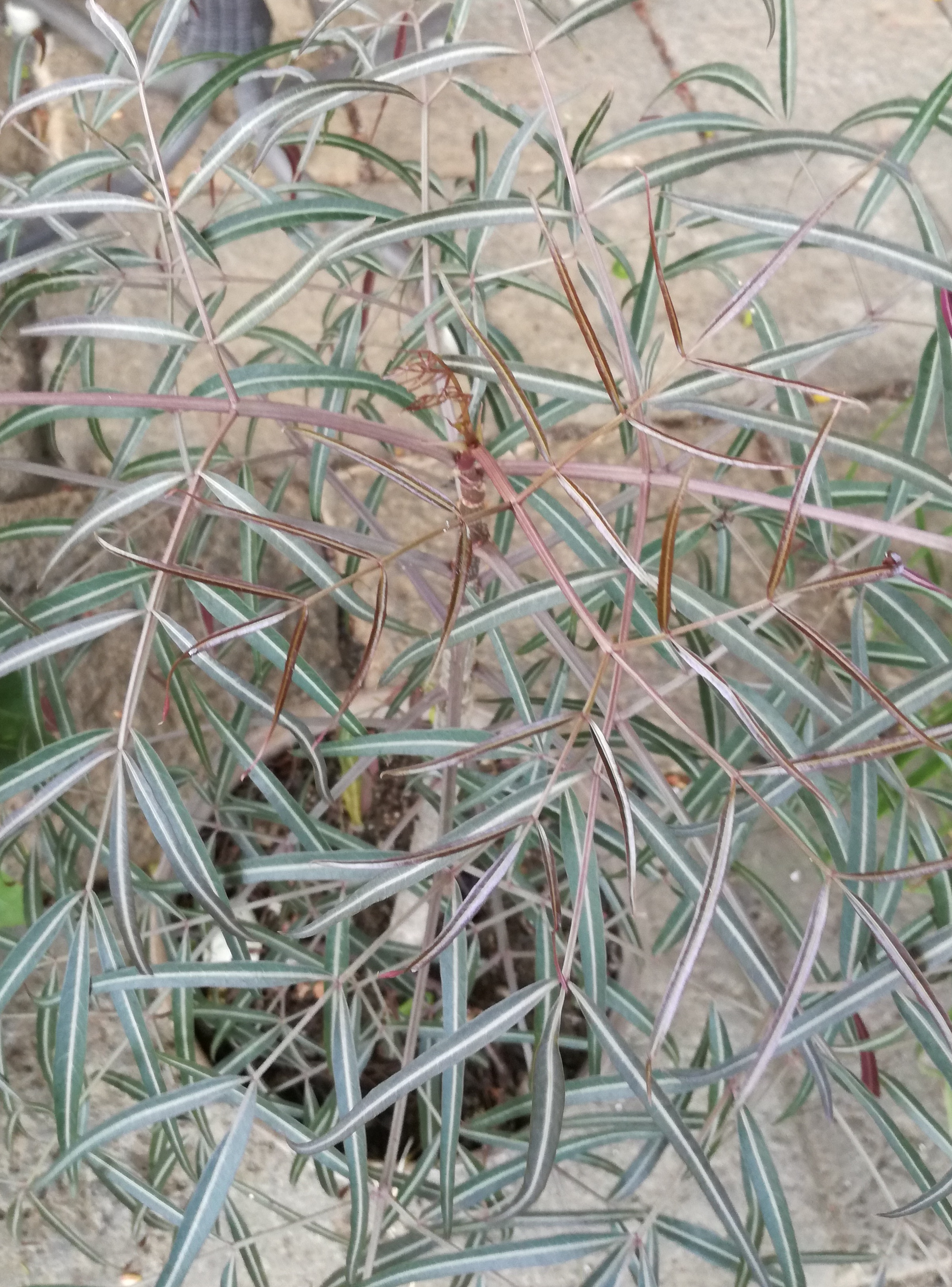
Juvenile leaves

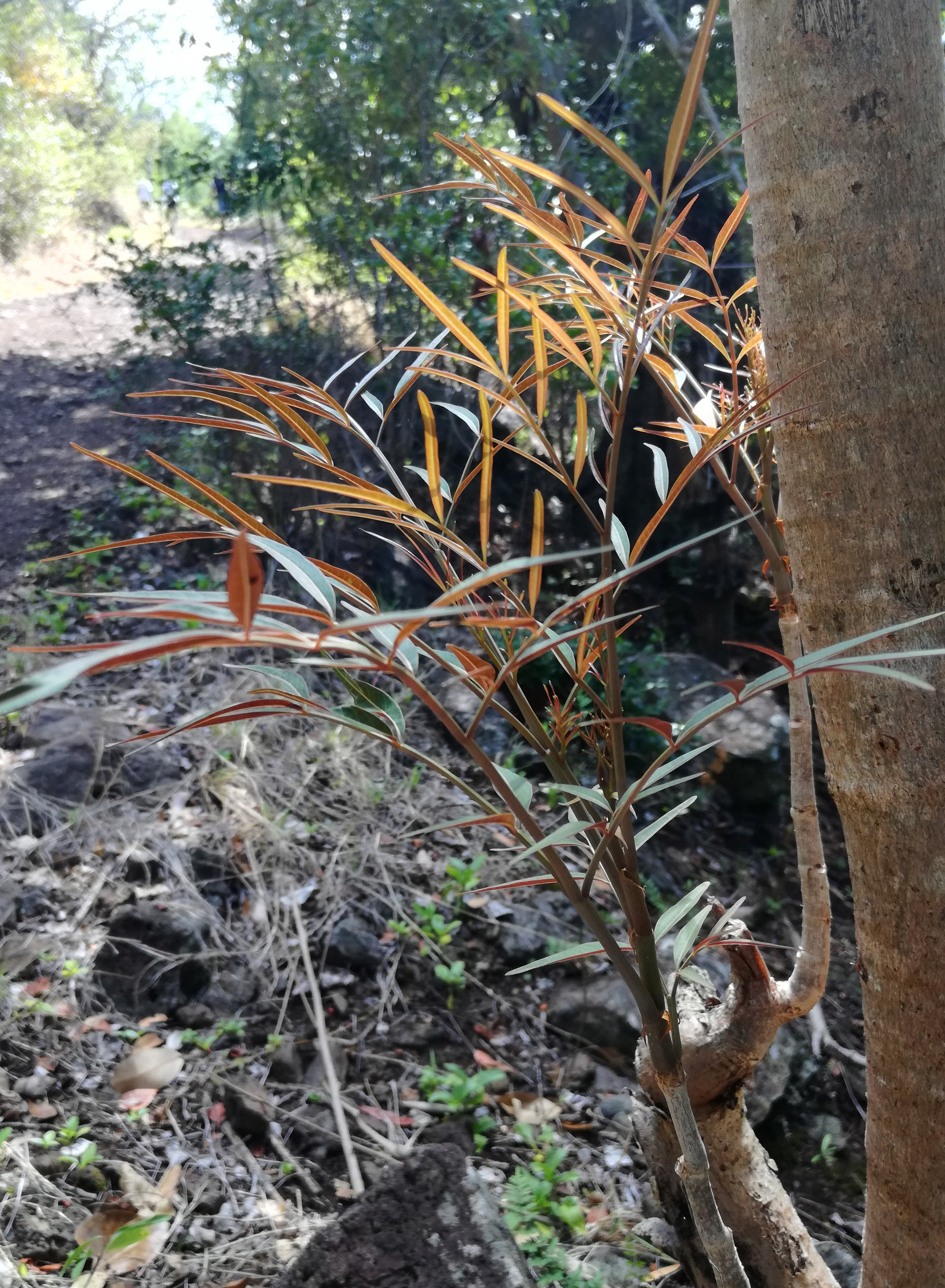
Basal shoot

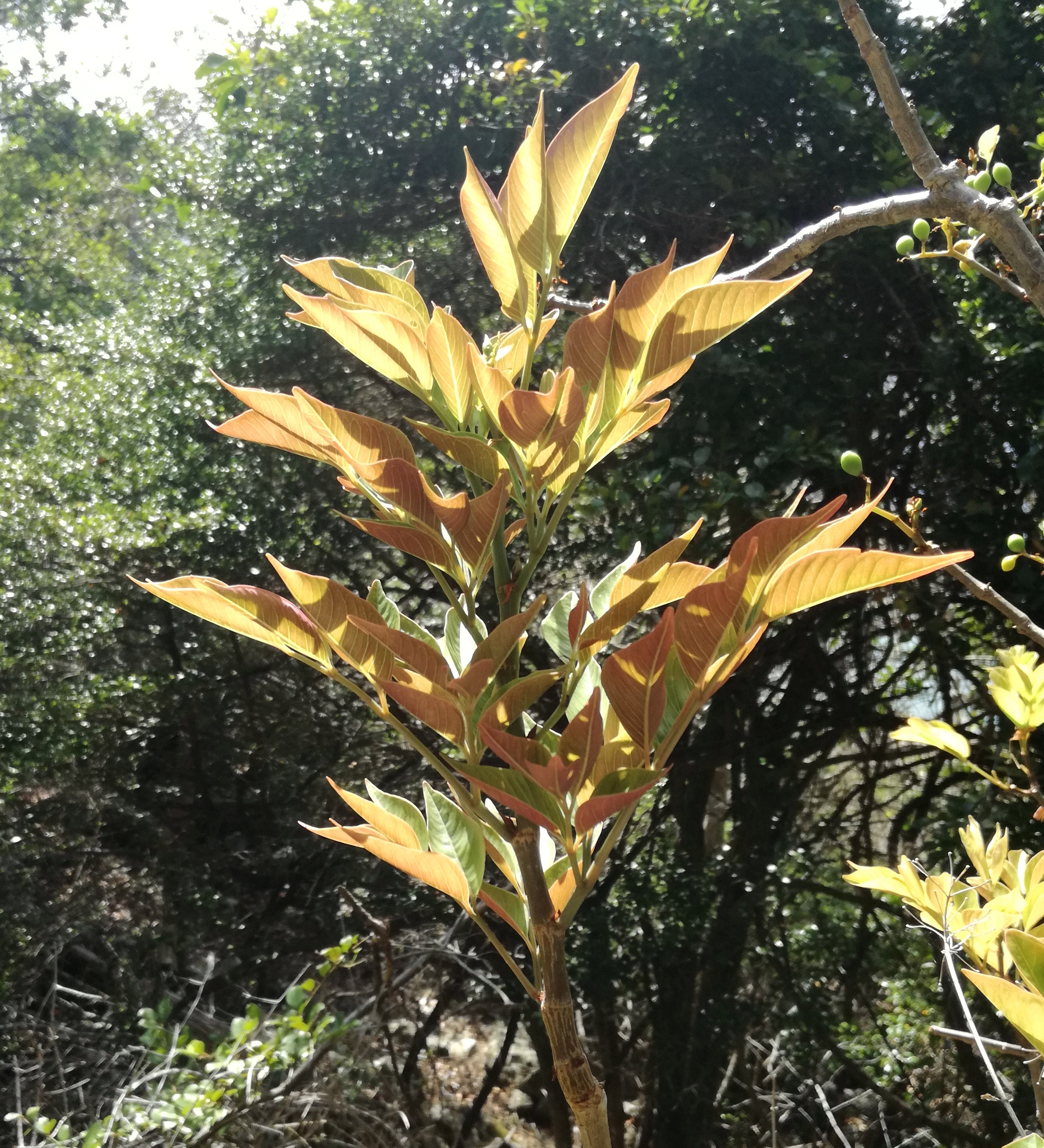
Subadult leaves

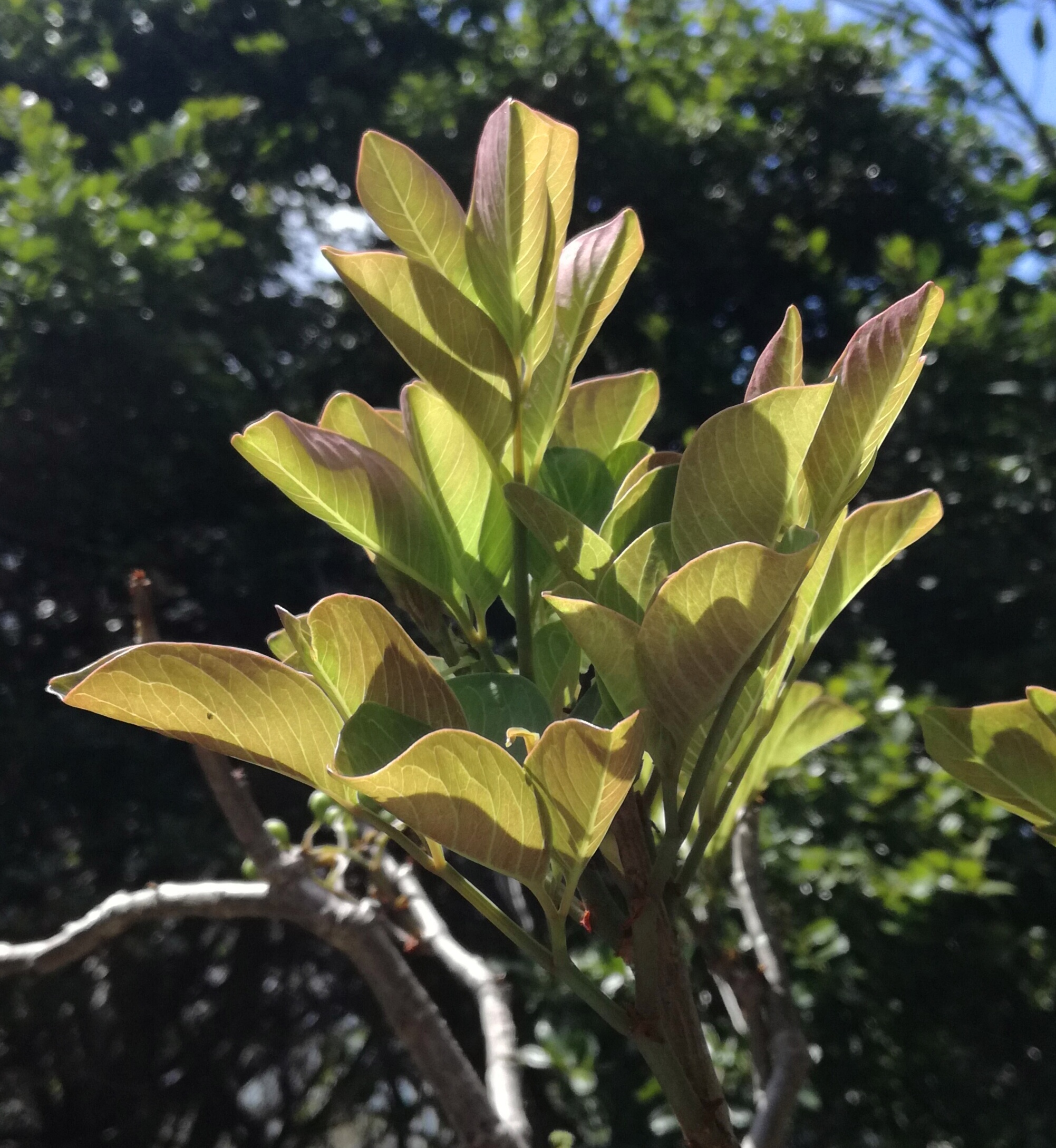
Young adult leaves

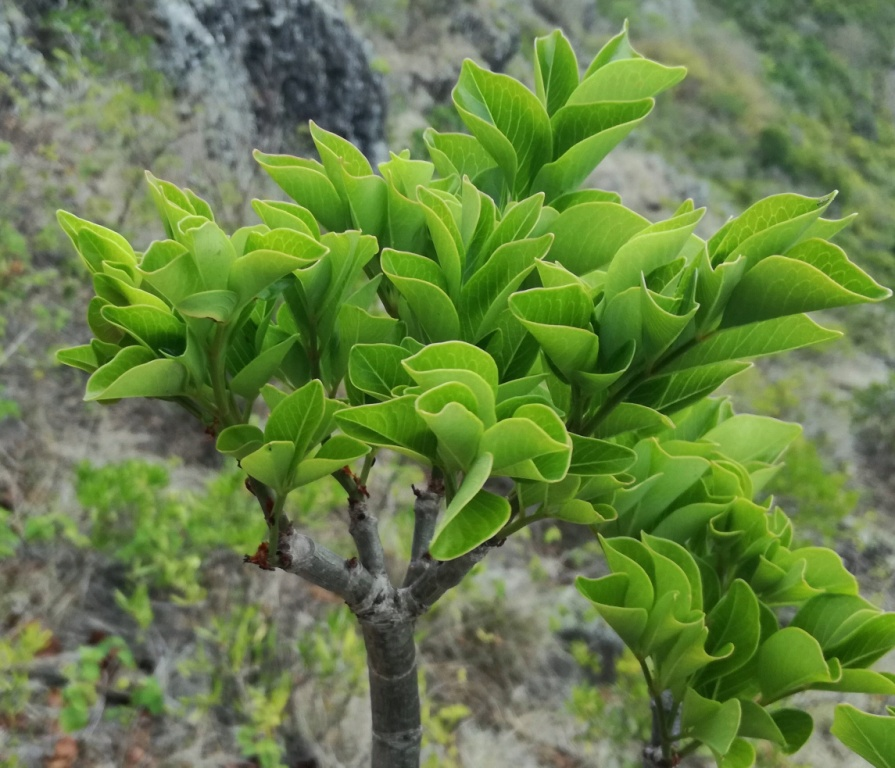
Adult leaves

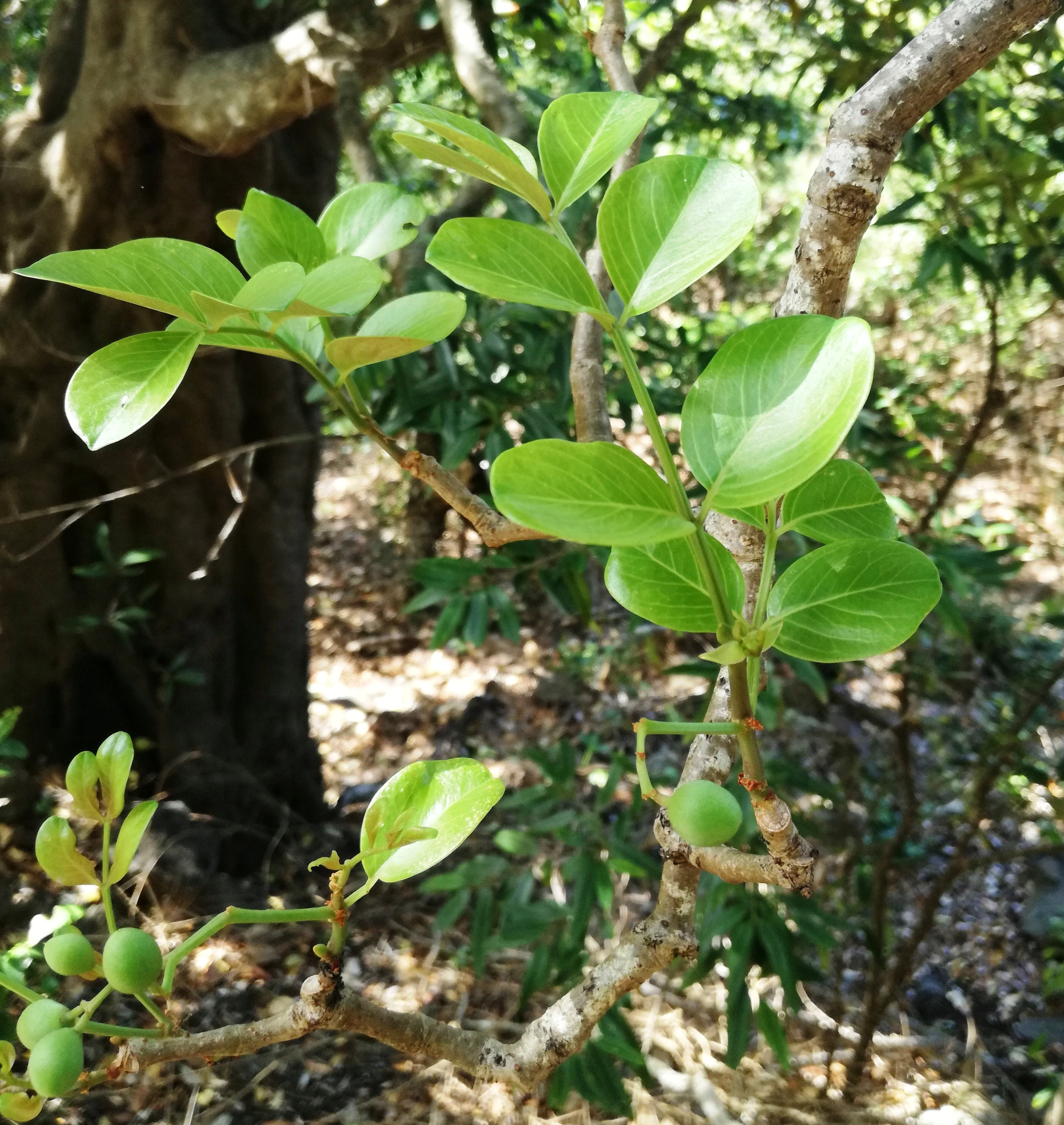
Adult leaves (rounded)

== Distribution ==
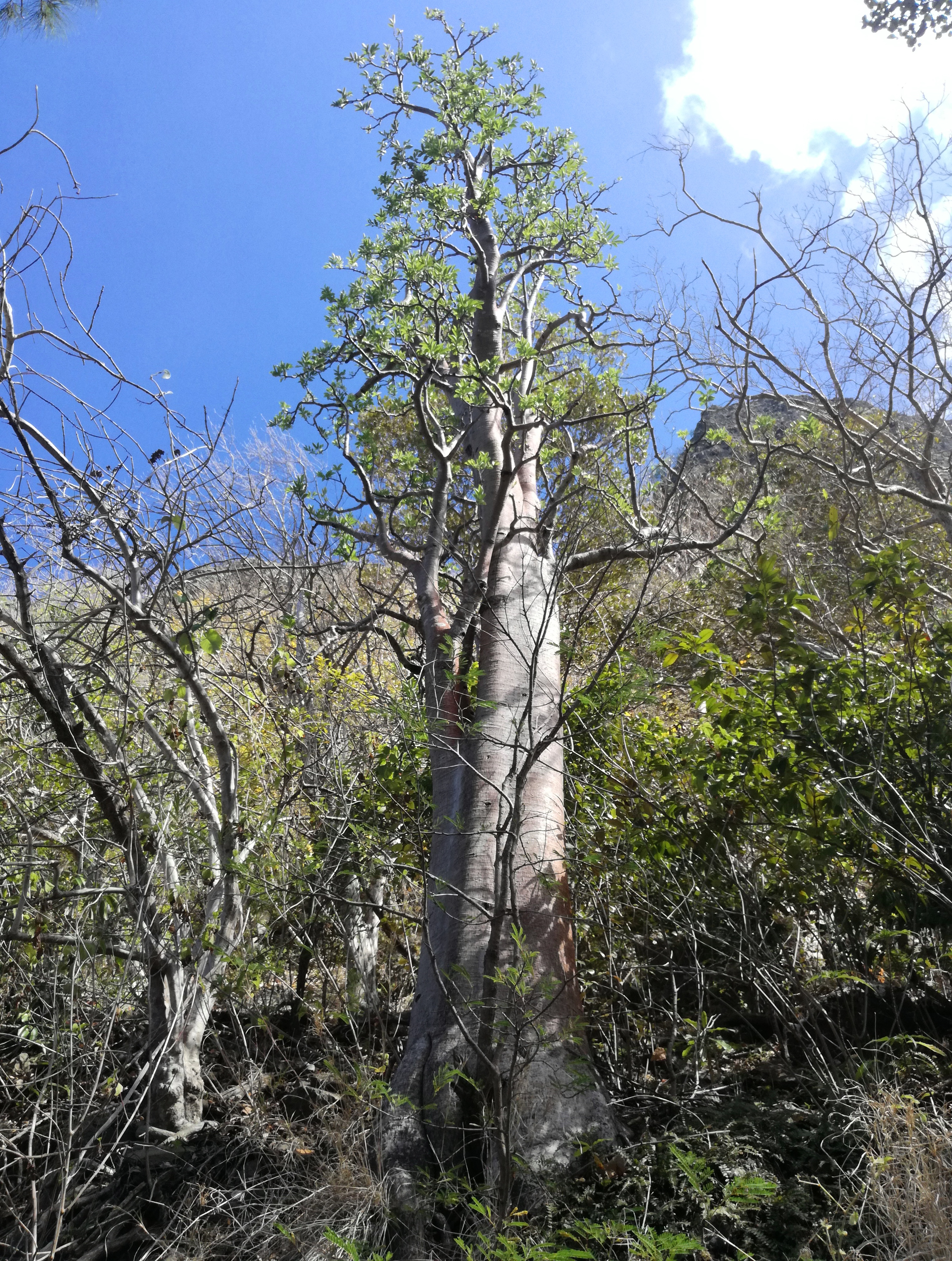
This is by far the largest species of Cyphostemma (a special case of "island gigantism").

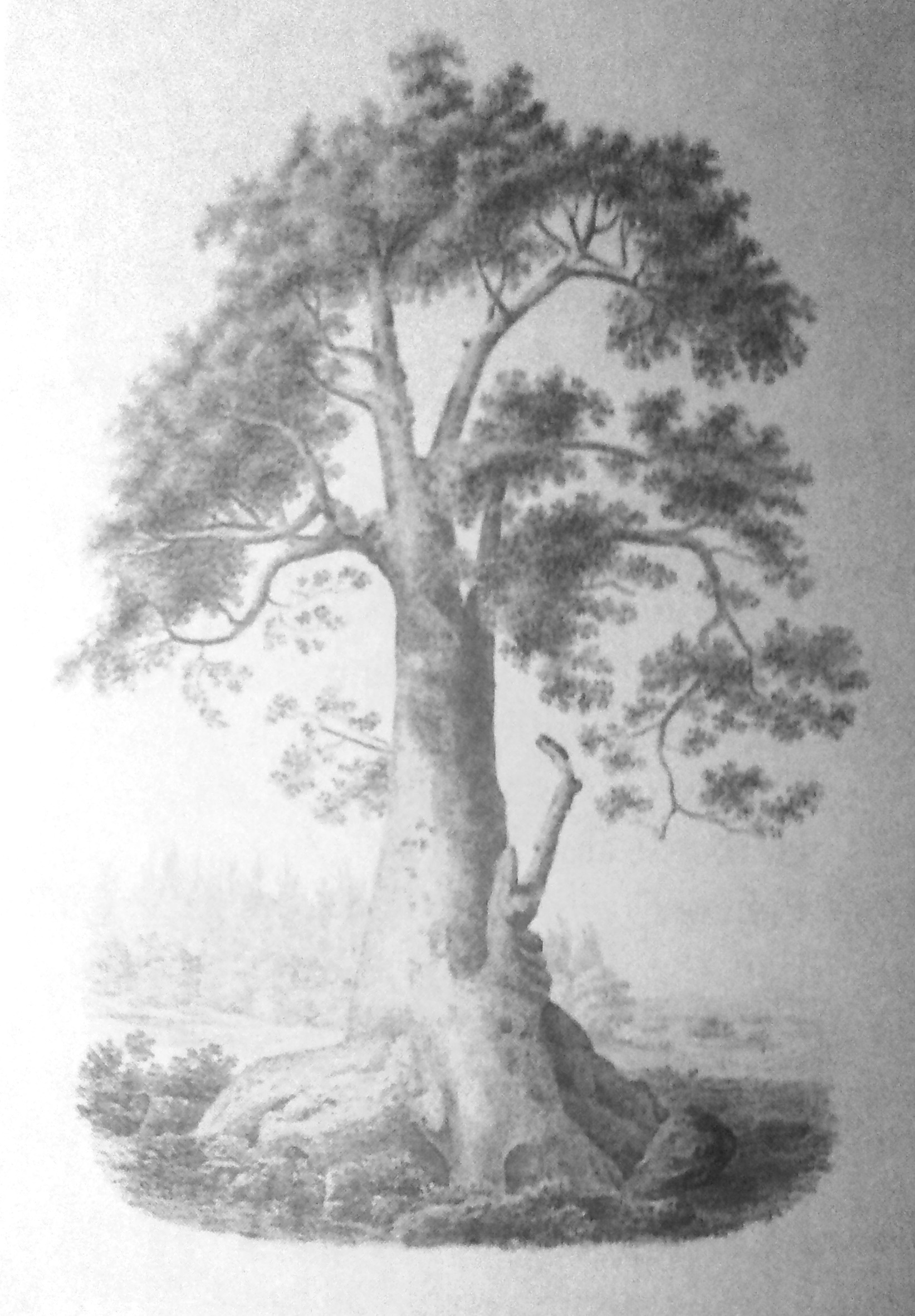
An early sketch of a Mapou tree (E.Pitot). This species was once common across Mauritius.

It used to be widespread throughout the dry and semi-dry forests of the island, but especially in more exposed or mountainous areas. It was reported to be extremely common especially on and around Le Pouce and in the north, especially around the town of Mapou (to which it gave its name), although it was already rare there by 1800. It was also reported in large numbers in the hills and mountains around Moka; as well as in the lowland forests across the island.

It was exterminated from much of its natural range, but can still occasionally be found on extremely rocky slopes or outcrops in the higher mountains. It can be found on the mountain ranges of Trois Mamelles and Rempart, and in some of the remaining dry forests in the west of the island, especially around Magenta and Yemen.

== Cultivation ==
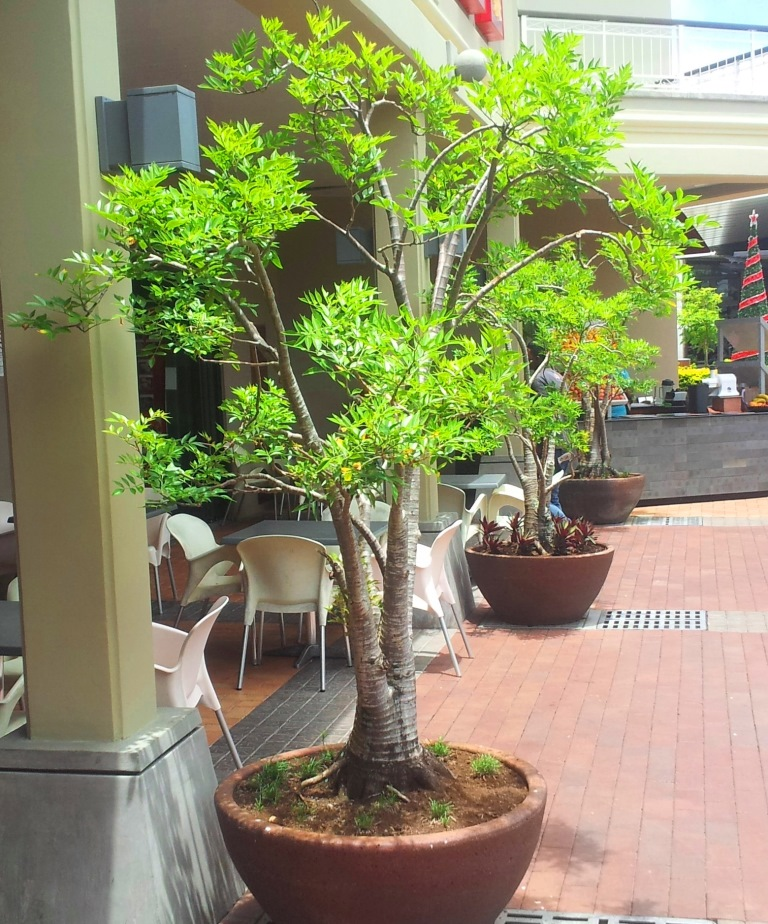
Young Mapou tree in cultivation in Mauritius

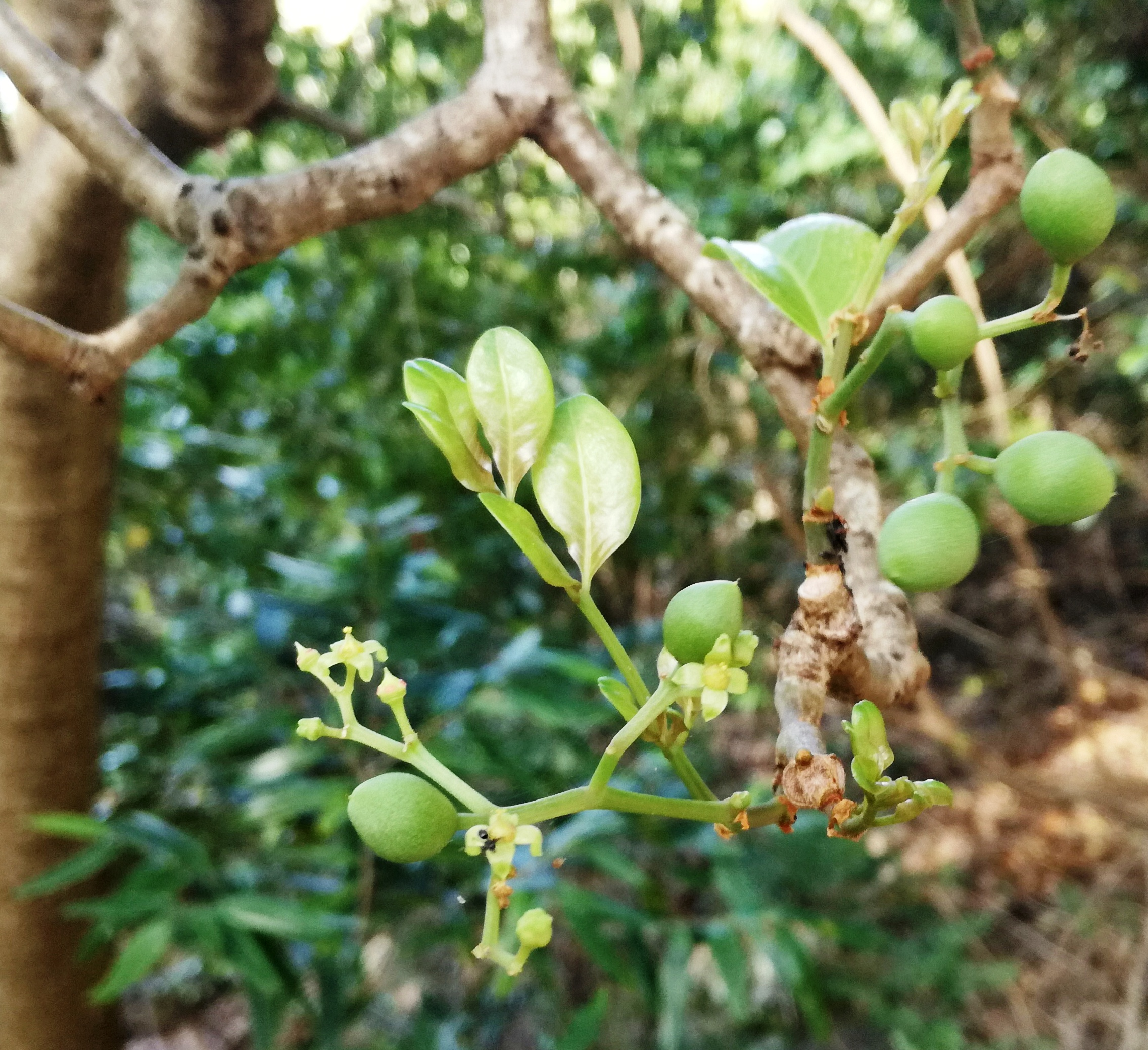
The (unripe) grapes of Cyphostemma mappia.

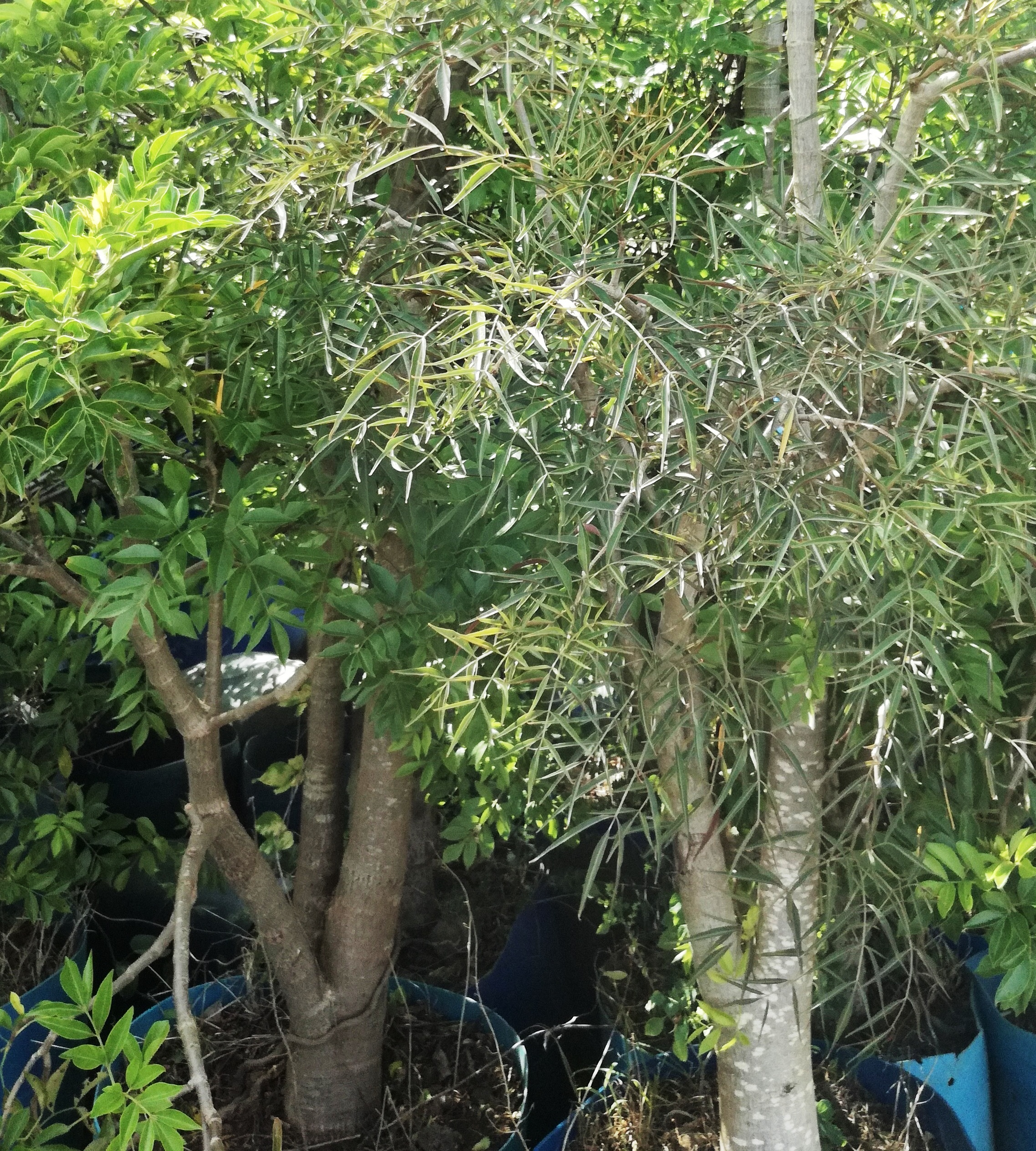
There are many natural varieties in Cyphostemma mappia, even among those of the same age.

It is relatively slow-growing, but is increasingly used as a decorative ornamental for hotels and public landscaping in Mauritius.

It is easily propagated by cuttings, which can be rooted in water, or in a damp, shady environment. It can also be grown from seed.
