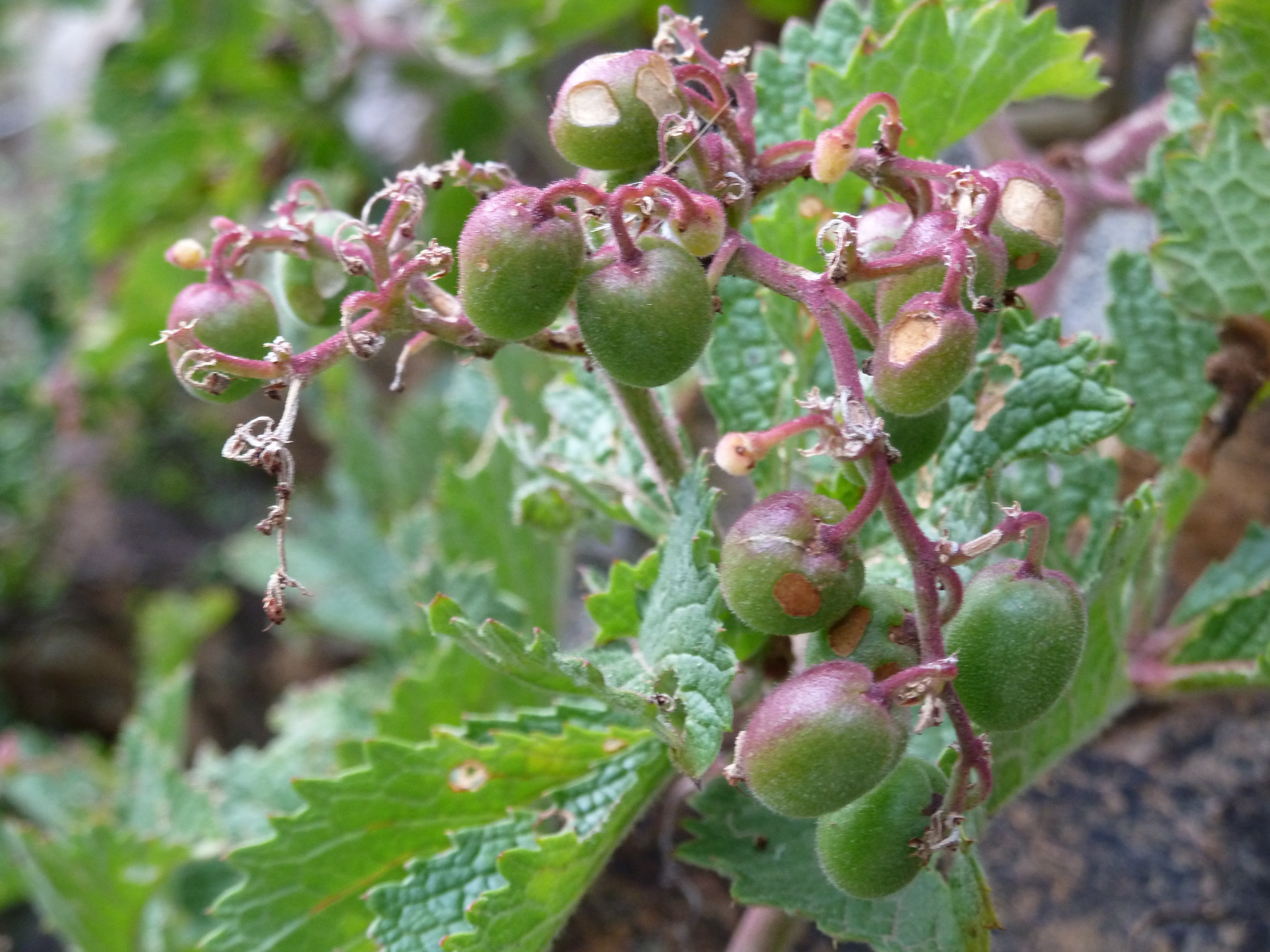
- In Roodepoort, South Africa

Scientific classification
- Kingdom: Plantae
- Clade: Tracheophytes
- Clade: Angiosperms
- Clade: Eudicots
- Clade: Rosids
- Order: Vitales
- Family: Vitaceae
- Genus: Cyphostemma
- Species: C. cirrhosum

Binomial name
- Cyphostemma cirrhosum (Thunb.) Desc. ex Wild & R.B.Drumm.

= Cyphostemma cirrhosum =

Species of vine

Cyphostemma cirrhosum is a species of plant native to southern Africa. It is a soft-stemmed creeper with succulent, yellowish-green leaves. It bears yellow flowers and red, oval-shaped fruit.
