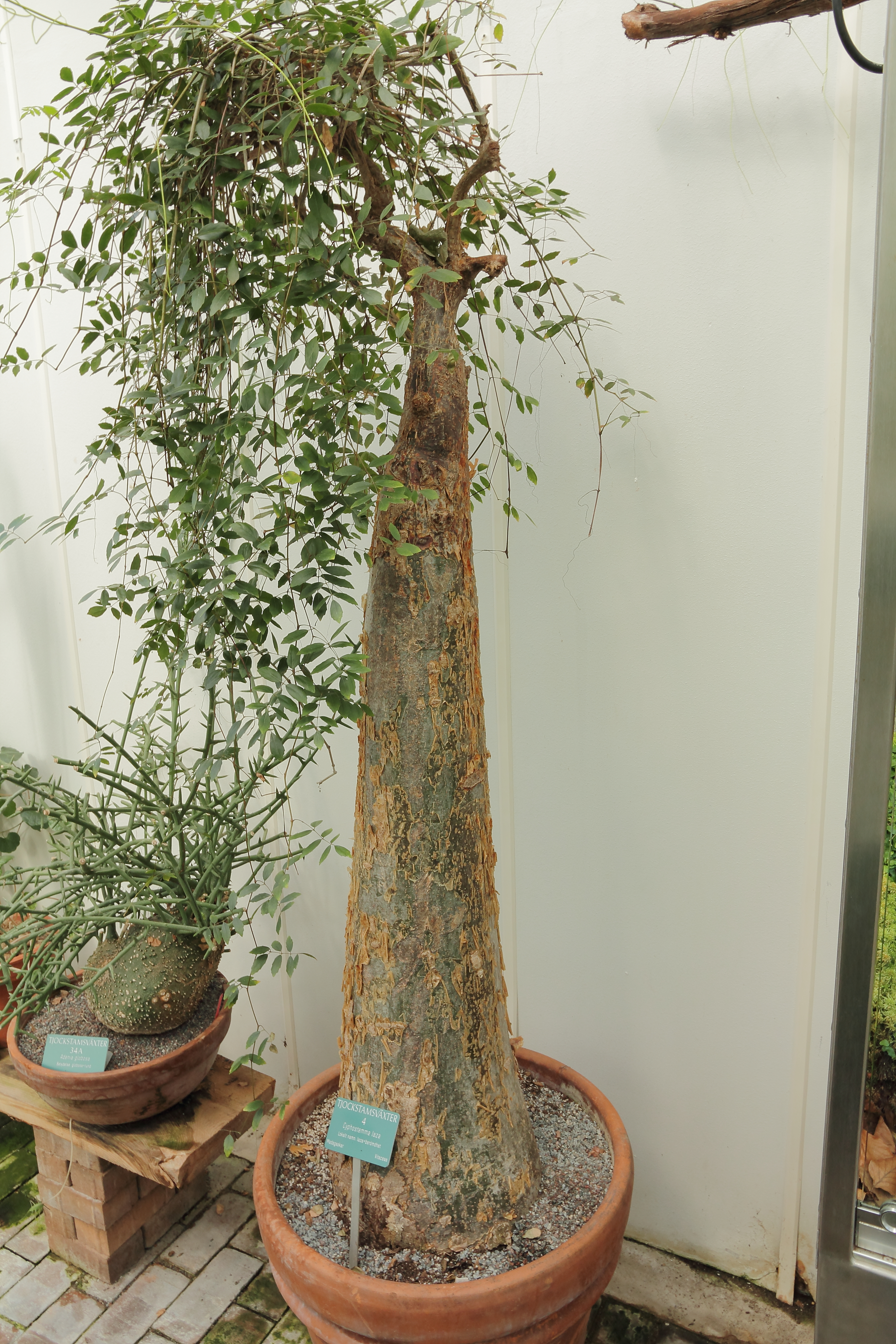

Scientific classification
- Kingdom: Plantae
- Clade: Tracheophytes
- Clade: Angiosperms
- Clade: Eudicots
- Clade: Rosids
- Order: Vitales
- Family: Vitaceae
- Genus: Cyphostemma
- Species: C. laza

Binomial name
- Cyphostemma laza Desc.

= Cyphostemma laza =

Species of caudiciform

Cyphostemma laza, also known as laza grape, laza tree, or laza, is a species of caudiciform vine, in the Vitaceae family.

== Description ==
C. laza is known for its swollen, trunk-like base (caudex), which can grow up to 500 mm (20 in) in diameter and 1.5 m (4 ft 11 in) in height. It has vining stems, that can extend up to 5 m (16 ft) in length and spread out from the caudex.

== Distribution and habitat ==
It is endemic to Madagascar and grows in well-drained soil in an arid and rocky environment. It grows in Toliara Province at elevations between 10 and 1000 m above sea level.

== Uses ==
The IUCN reports that there are no known uses for C. laza. But laza tree has been in horticulture due to its unique form.
