= Laza mine =

Tin mine in Spain

- Location: Province of Ourense, Spain
- Products: tin

The Laza mine is a large open pit mine located in the north-western part of Spain in Province of Ourense. Laza represents one of the largest tin reserves in Spain having estimated reserves of 20 million tonnes of ore grading 0.05% tin.
