= Naukluft Mountain Zebra Park =

Namibian nature reserve

Coordinates: 24°15′S 16°1′E

Naukluft Mountain Zebra Park is a protected reserve of Namibia. It is located south of Gamsberg Nature Reserve, northwest of Hardap Game Reserve and north of Namib-Naukluft National Park.

The Naukluft section of the Namib-Naukluft Park was initially created as a sanctuary for the Hartmann's mountain zebra.
