= Bernard Descoings =

French botanist

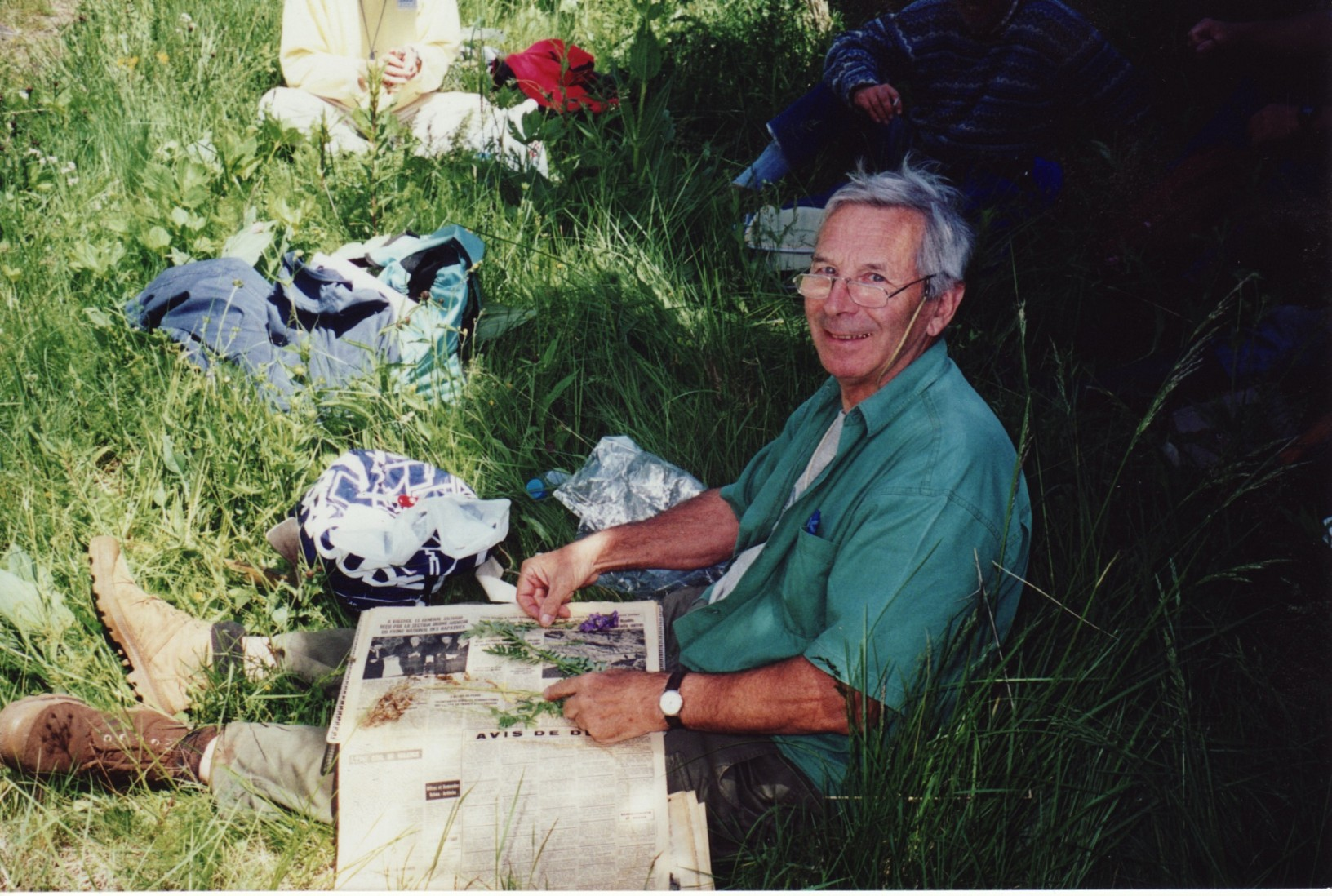
- Bernard Descoings
- Born: Bernard Marie Descoings; September 7, 1931; 14th arrondissement of Paris
- Died: October 23, 2018 (aged 87); Largentière
- Citizenship: France
- Known for: Studies of tropical plants in Africa (Madagascar, Côte d'Ivoire, Gabon) and South America (French Guiana
- Scientific career
- Fields: botany
- Author abbrev. (botany): Desc.

Bernard Marie Descoings (7 September 1931 – 23 October 2018) was a French botanist. He specialized in tropical plants in Africa (Madagascar, Côte d'Ivoire, Gabon) and South America (French Guiana), and had a special interest in the kalanchoes of Madagascar.
