= Pseudocayratia oligocarpa =

Scientific classification
- Kingdom: Plantae
- Clade: Tracheophytes
- Clade: Angiosperms
- Clade: Eudicots
- Clade: Rosids
- Order: Vitales
- Family: Vitaceae
- Subfamily: Vitoideae
- Tribe: Cayratieae
- Genus: Pseudocayratia
- Species: P. oligocarpa

Binomial name
- Pseudocayratia oligocarpa (H.Lév. & Vaniot) J.Wen & L.M.Lu

Synonyms
- Cayratia oligocarpa (Lév. & Vaniot) Gagnep.; Vitis oligocarpa Lév. & Vaniot (basionym); Columella oligocarpa (Lév. & Vaniot) Rehder; Cissus aligocarpa (Lév. & Vaniot) L. H. Bailey

Species of vines

Pseudocayratia oligocarpa is a species of Asian vine plants in the subfamily Vitoideae. Previously belonging to the non-monophyletic genus Cayratia, this species is found from central-southern China to Vietnam. These genera are not dissimilar and are now placed in the tribe Cayratieae.
