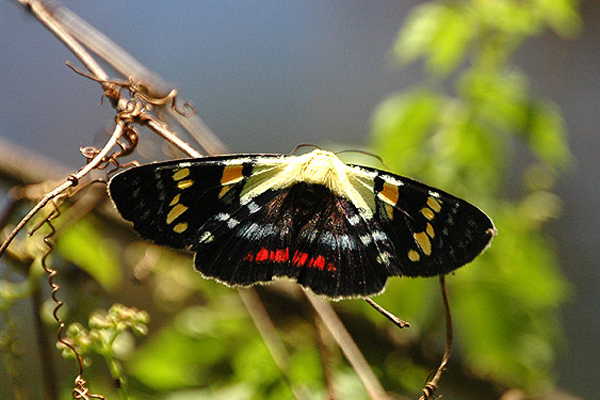

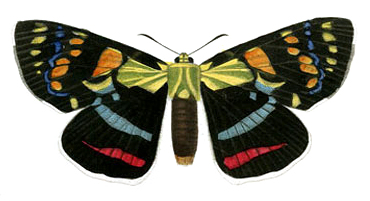

Scientific classification
- Kingdom: Animalia
- Phylum: Arthropoda
- Class: Insecta
- Order: Lepidoptera
- Superfamily: Noctuoidea
- Family: Noctuidae
- Genus: Agarista
- Species: A. agricola

Binomial name
- Agarista agricola (Donovan, 1805)

Synonyms
- Papilio agricola Donovan, 1805; Agarista picta Leach, 1814

= Agarista agricola =

Species of moth

Agarista agricola, Joseph's coat moth or painted vine moth, is a medium-sized moth of the family Noctuidae. The species was first described by Edward Donovan in 1805 (as Papilio agricola).

== Distribution ==
Papua New Guinea and Australia (Queensland, Northern Territory, New South Wales, Victoria).

== Description and behaviour ==
Caterpillars grow up to 7 cm. Early instar caterpillars are green and brown, with sparse hairs that are spiky in shape. As they grow, they come to feature orange feet and head, are banded predominantly black and white with two orange bands (respectively on the final abdominal segment and on the mesothorax) and the sparse hairs become club-shaped with white tips. Before pupation, the white bands turn orange. Caterpillars pupate on branches, in cocoons covered by chewed pieces of bark.

Adult moths are diurnal and have black wings with yellow, red, white and blue markings. The species is sexually dimorph, with males smaller than females and having a smaller white patch at the base of the forewings. Wingspan approximately 5 cm for males and 7 cm for females.

=== Food plants ===
Caterpillars of Agarista agricola feed on vines of multiple Vitaceae species: Cissus opaca, Causonis clematidea, Vitis vinifera.
