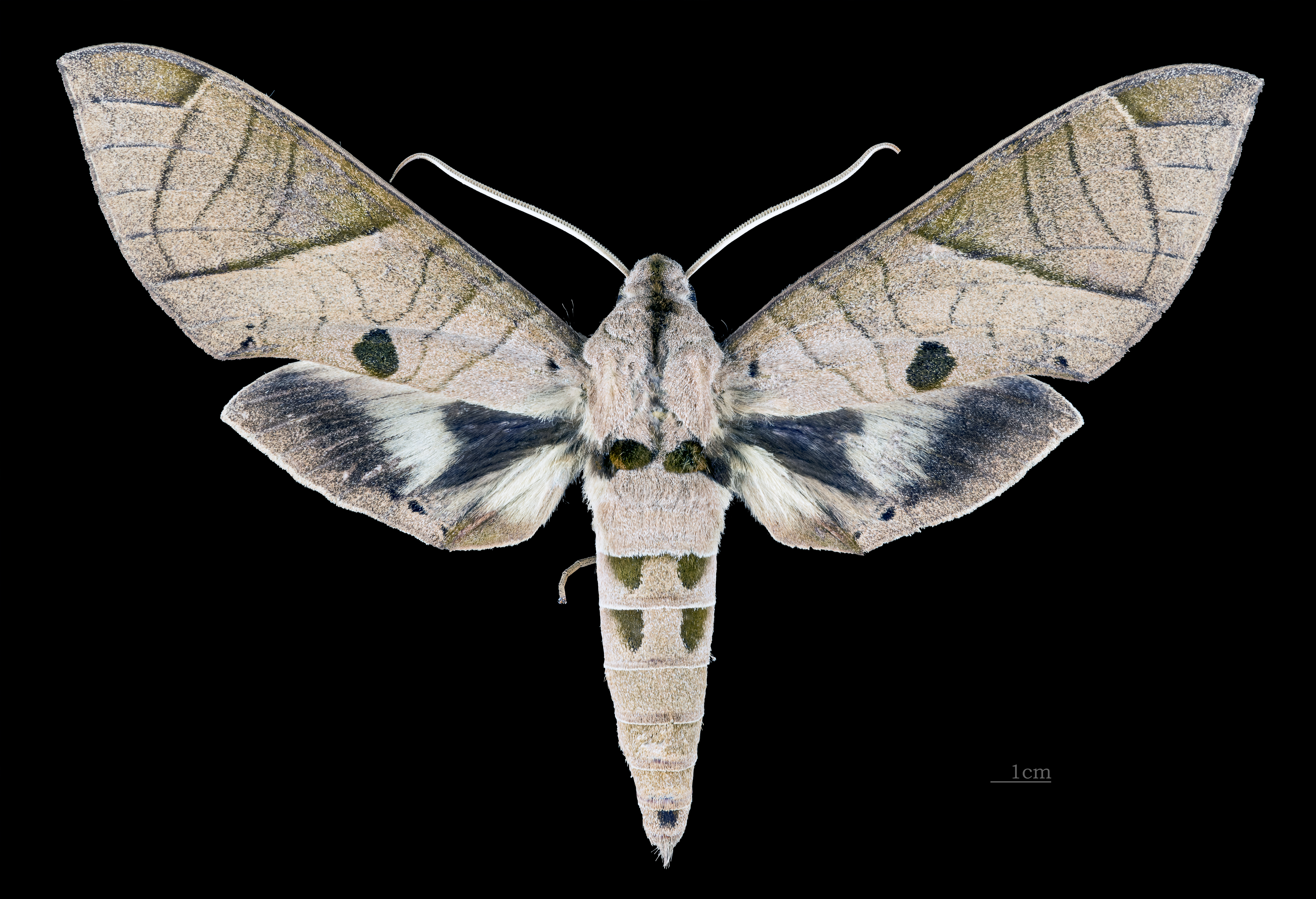
- Female dorsal
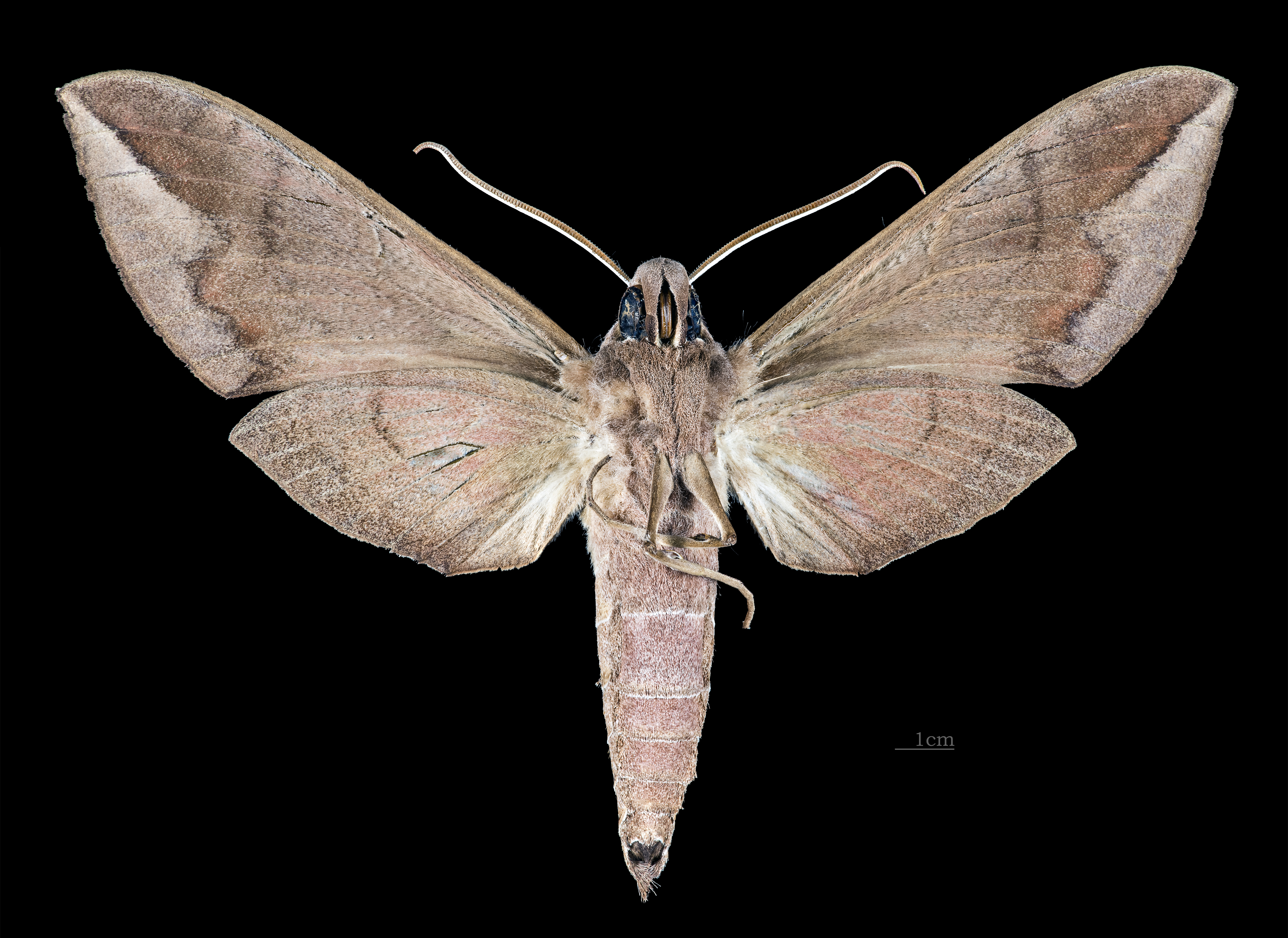
- Female ventral

Scientific classification
- Domain: Eukaryota
- Kingdom: Animalia
- Phylum: Arthropoda
- Class: Insecta
- Order: Lepidoptera
- Family: Sphingidae
- Genus: Eumorpha
- Species: E. translineatus

Binomial name
- Eumorpha translineatus (Rothschild, 1895)

Synonyms
- Philampelus translineatus Rothschild, 1895; Eumorpha translineatus extinctus Gehlen, 1926

= Eumorpha translineatus =

Species of moth

Eumorpha translineatus is a moth of the family Sphingidae.

== Distribution ==
It is known from Brazil and Bolivia.

== Description ==
It can be distinguished from all other Eumorpha species by the pale brown forewing upperside crossed by a series of narrow dark brown transverse lines resembling the pattern seen in species of Marumba and the almost circular dark brown patch near the middle of the posterior margin. It can be distinguished from Eumorpha adamsi by the lack of pink coloration on the hindwing upperside.

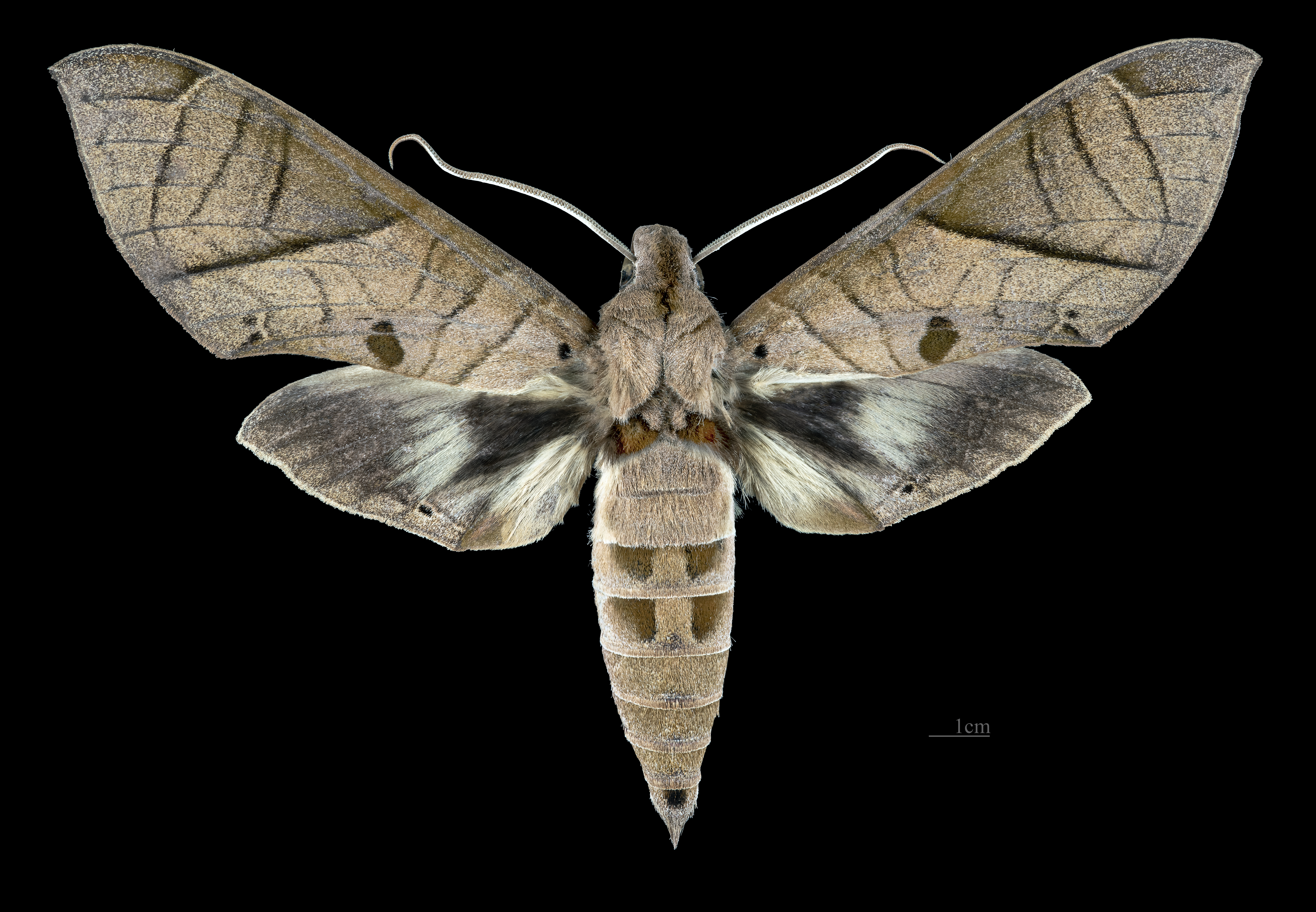
Male dorsal

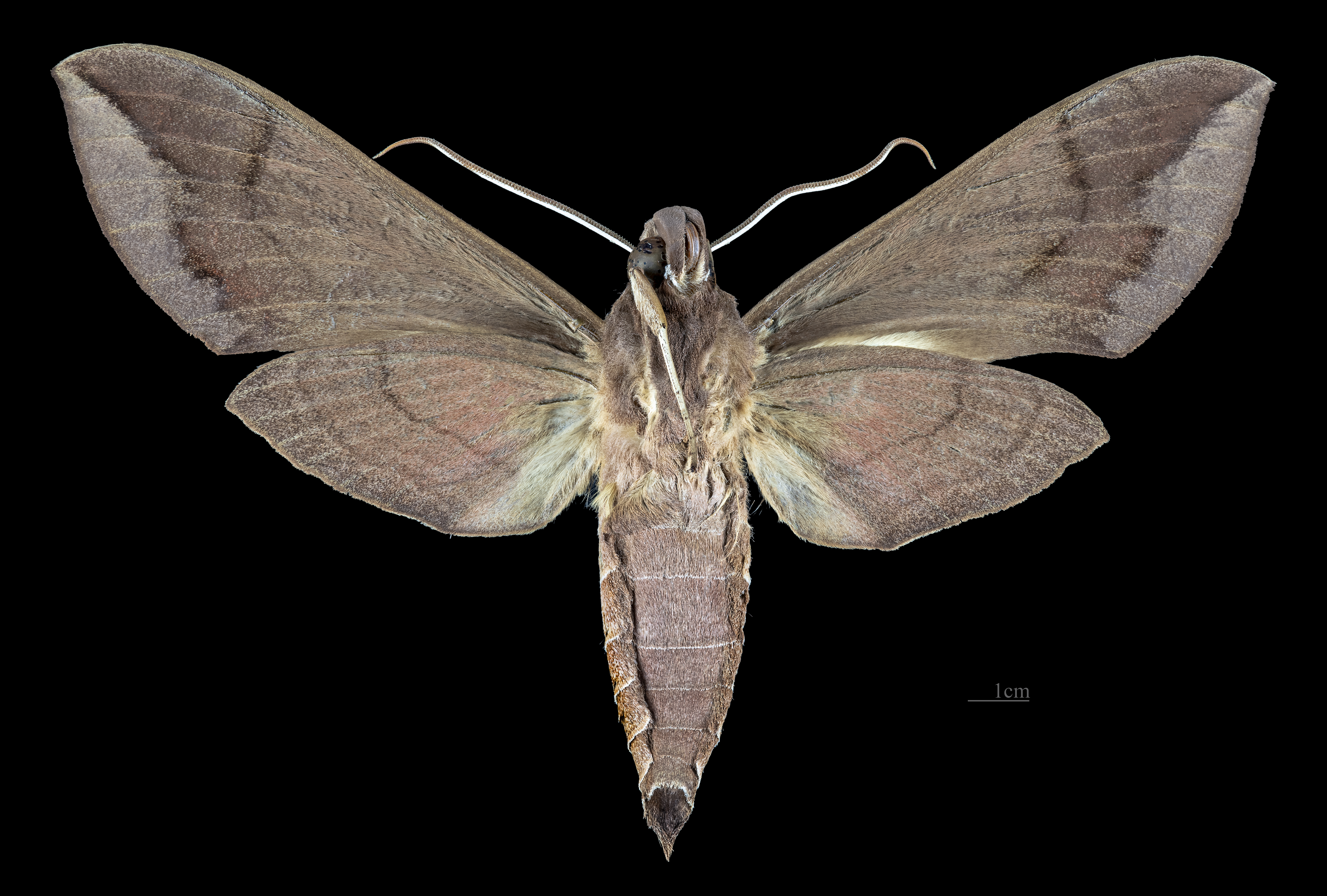
Male ventral

== Biology ==
The larvae probably feed on Vitaceae species.
