= Afrocayratia =

- Afrocayratia ibuensis

Scientific classification
- Kingdom: Plantae
- Clade: Tracheophytes
- Clade: Angiosperms
- Clade: Eudicots
- Clade: Rosids
- Order: Vitales
- Family: Vitaceae
- Tribe: Cayratieae
- Genus: Afrocayratia; J.Wen, L.M.Lu, Rabarij. & Z.D.Chen

Genus of plant

Afrocayratia is a genus of flowering plants in the grapevine family Vitaceae. Its species are found in tropical and southern Africa, Yemen, Mayotte, and Madagascar. It was split off from the non-monophyletic genus Cayratia in 2020.

== Species ==
The following species are accepted:

- Afrocayratia debilis (Baker) J.Wen & L.M.Lu
- Afrocayratia delicatula (Willems) J.Wen & Z.D.Chen
- Afrocayratia gracilis (Guill. & Perr.) J.Wen & Z.D.Chen
- Afrocayratia ibuensis (Hook.f.) J.Wen & V.C.Dang
- Afrocayratia imerinensis (Baker) J.Wen & L.M.Lu
- Afrocayratia longiflora (Desc.) J.Wen & Rabarij.
- Afrocayratia triternata (Baker) J.Wen & Rabarij.
