= Pterocissus =

Scientific classification
- Kingdom: Plantae
- Clade: Tracheophytes
- Clade: Angiosperms
- Clade: Eudicots
- Clade: Rosids
- Order: Vitales
- Family: Vitaceae
- Subfamily: Vitoideae
- Genus: Pterocissus; Urban et Ekman, 1926

Species
- Pterocissus mirabilis synonym of Cissus mirabilis (Urb. & Ekman) Lombardi

Genus of vines

Pterocissus is a plant genus in the family Vitaceae, containing one species, Pterocissus mirabilis.
