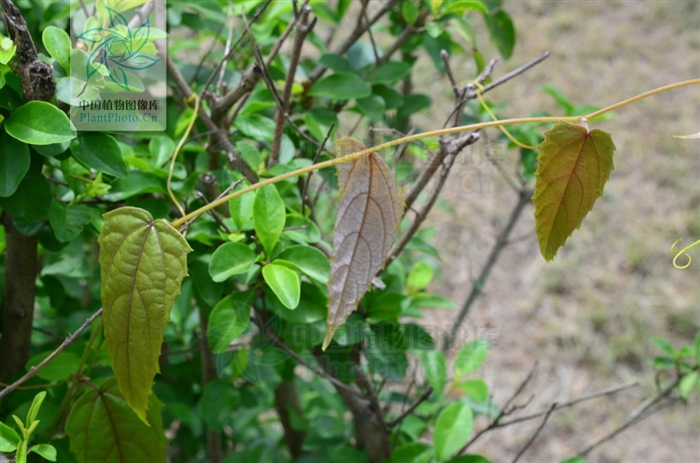

Scientific classification
- Kingdom: Plantae
- Clade: Tracheophytes
- Clade: Angiosperms
- Clade: Eudicots
- Clade: Rosids
- Order: Vitales
- Family: Vitaceae
- Genus: Vitis
- Species: V. tsoii

Binomial name
- Vitis tsoii Merr.

= Vitis tsoii =

Species of grapevine

Vitis tsoii is a species of wild grape in the family Vitaceae. It is native to the provinces of Fujian, Guangdong, and Guangxi in China, where the climate is temperate.
