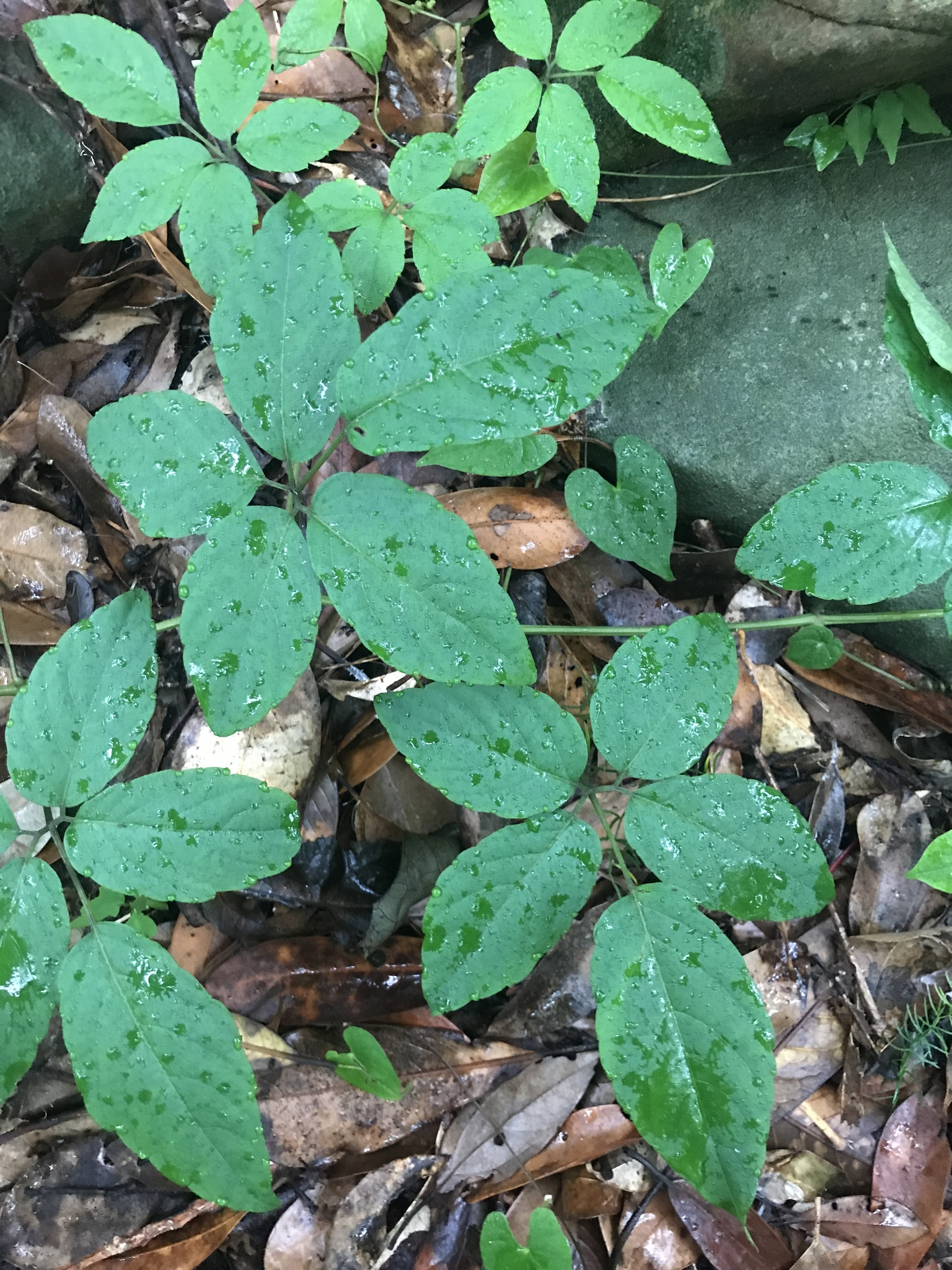
- Pseudocayratia yoshimurae in Kagoshima, Japan

Scientific classification
- Kingdom: Plantae
- Clade: Tracheophytes
- Clade: Angiosperms
- Clade: Eudicots
- Clade: Rosids
- Order: Vitales
- Family: Vitaceae
- Subfamily: Vitoideae
- Tribe: Cayratieae
- Genus: Pseudocayratia; J.Wen, L.M.Lu, Z.D.Chen, 2018

= Pseudocayratia =

Genus of vines

External image
- Images at iNaturalist

Pseudocayratia is a genus of Asian vine plants in the family Vitaceae. As its name suggests, it was split from the previously configured genus Cayratia, which was found not to be monophyletic: for example, Pseudocayratia oligocarpa, from central China to Vietnam, was distinct from Cayratia pedata (the type species of that genus). Species have been recorded from central-southern China, Japan, the Ryukyu Islands, Taiwan and Vietnam.

== Species ==
Plants of the World Online currently includes:

1. Pseudocayratia dichromocarpa (H.Lév.) J.Wen & Z.D.Chen
2. Pseudocayratia oligocarpa (H.Lév. & Vaniot) J.Wen & L.M.Lu
3. Pseudocayratia pengiana T.W.Hsu & J.Wen
4. Pseudocayratia speciosa J.Wen & L.M.Lu - type species
5. Pseudocayratia yoshimurae (Makino) J.Wen & V.C.Dang
