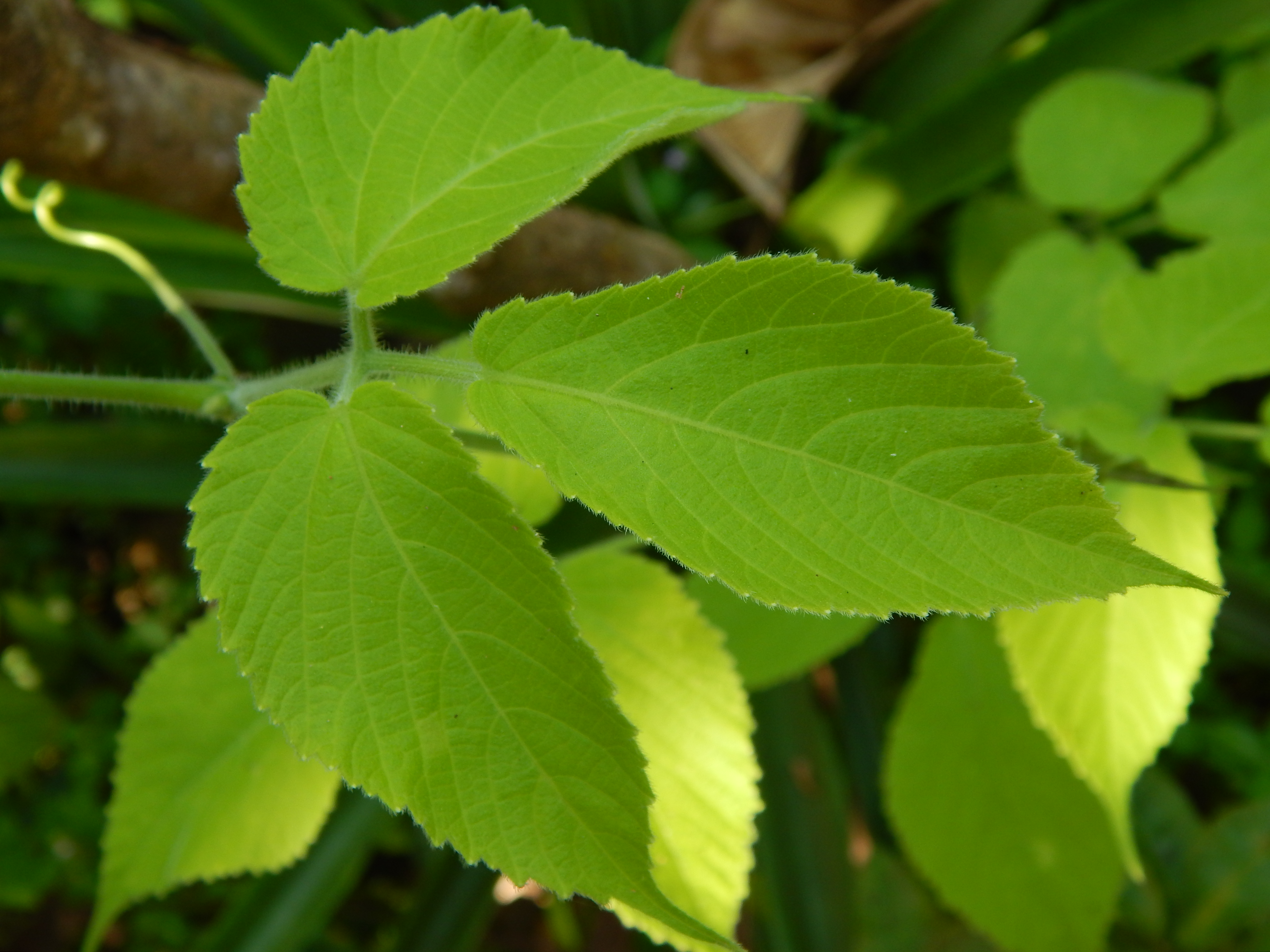
- Leaves of Cayratia mollissima

Scientific classification
- Kingdom: Plantae
- Clade: Tracheophytes
- Clade: Angiosperms
- Clade: Eudicots
- Clade: Rosids
- Order: Vitales
- Family: Vitaceae
- Genus: Cayratia
- Species: C. mollissima

Binomial name
- Cayratia mollissima (G.C.Wall) Gagnep.

= Cayratia mollissima =

Species of vine

Cayratia mollissima is an evergreen species of climber plant found in Indochina, Malaysia, Singapore and the Philippines. It has 3-foliate leaves with small bluish green flowers and produces pinkish white berries, and usually grows at forest margins. In some regions its fruit is used as a folk treatment for swelling and fever and its leaves in tea.
