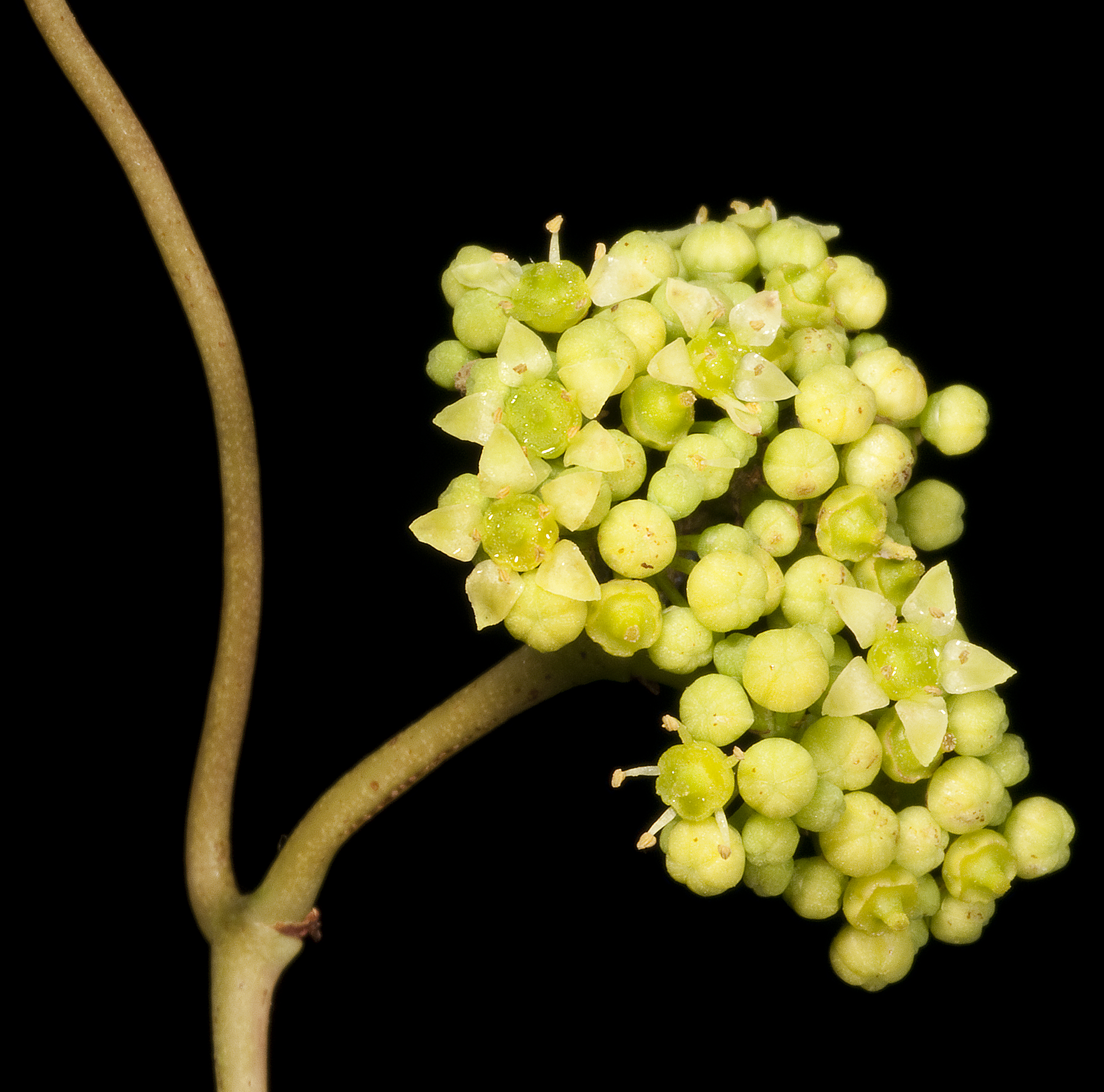

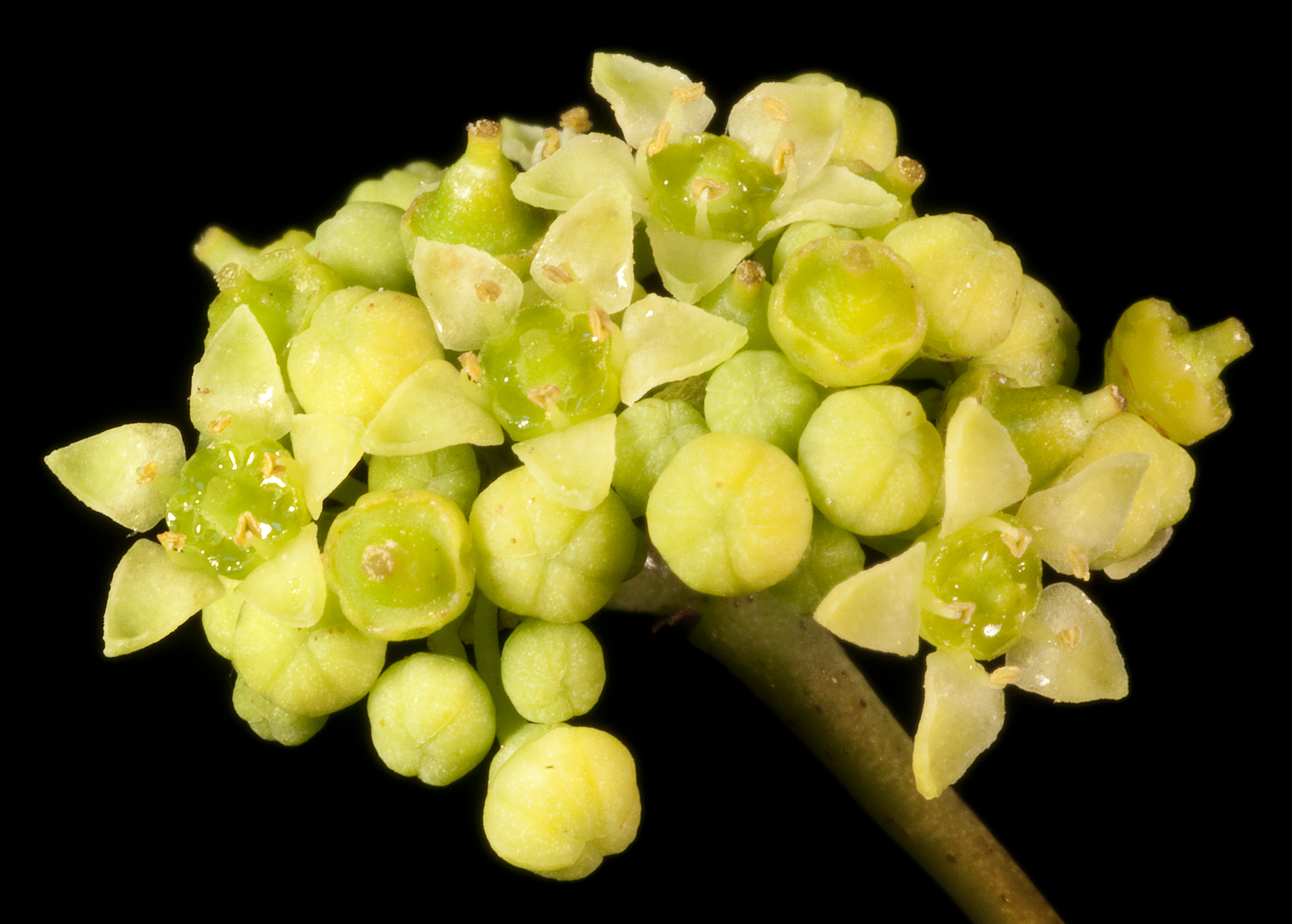

Scientific classification
- Kingdom: Plantae
- Clade: Tracheophytes
- Clade: Angiosperms
- Clade: Eudicots
- Clade: Rosids
- Order: Vitales
- Family: Vitaceae
- Genus: Clematicissus
- Species: C. angustissima

Binomial name
- Clematicissus angustissima (F.Muell.) Planch.

Synonyms
- Vitis angustissima F.Muell.

= Clematicissus angustissima =

Species of vine

Clematicissus angustissima is a vine in the Vitaceae family, endemic to the Geraldton area of Western Australia.

The species was first described as Vitis angustissima in 1859 by Ferdinand von Mueller, from a specimen collected by Oldfield on the Murchison River. In 1887Jules Planchon reassigned it to his newly described genus, Clematicissus, with Clematicussus angustissima being the type species.

== Description ==
C. angustissima is a deciduous vine growing from numerous tubers. The tendrils are leaf-opposed and the five-palmate (3–7) leaves can be entire or deeply indented. The inflorescence is leaf-opposed and multi-flowered with congested heads. Both calyx and corolla are five-lobed. The berries are fleshy and purplish-black to black when mature.

== Habitat ==
It is found in woodlands, generally on sand or loam.
