= Cissus elegans =

Scientific classification
- Kingdom: Plantae
- Clade: Tracheophytes
- Clade: Angiosperms
- Clade: Eudicots
- Clade: Rosids
- Order: Vitales
- Family: Vitaceae
- Genus: Cissus
- Species: C. elegans

Binomial name
- Cissus elegans K. Koch 1869

Species of vine

Cissus elegans is a species of flowering plants in the family Vitaceae.
