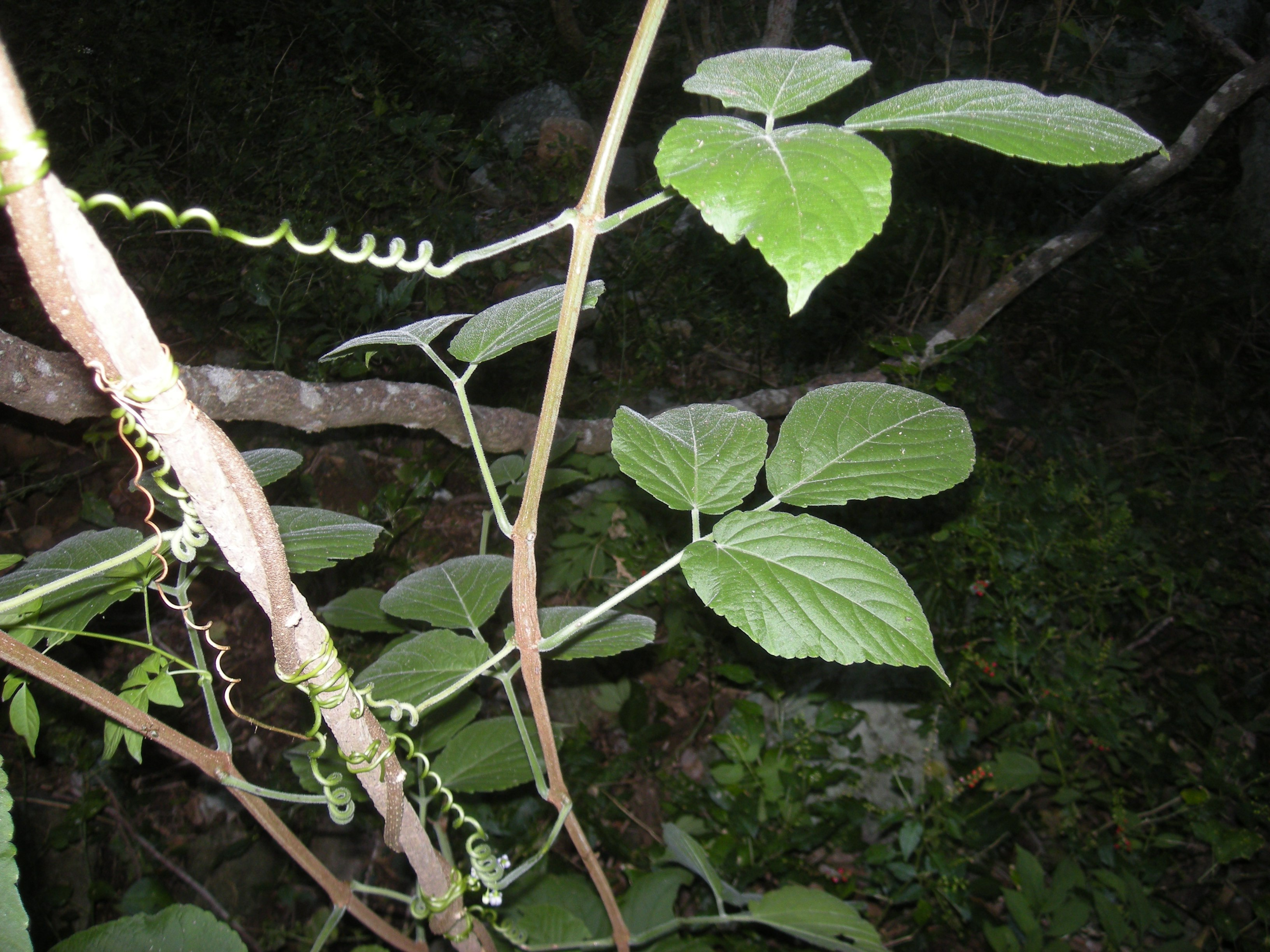

Scientific classification
- Kingdom: Plantae
- Clade: Tracheophytes
- Clade: Angiosperms
- Clade: Eudicots
- Clade: Rosids
- Order: Vitales
- Family: Vitaceae
- Genus: Cayratia
- Species: C. acris

Binomial name
- Cayratia acris (F. Muell.) Domin

= Cayratia acris =

Species of vine

Cayratia acris is a species of flowering plant in the family Vitaceae. It is native to Australia and Papua New Guinea.
