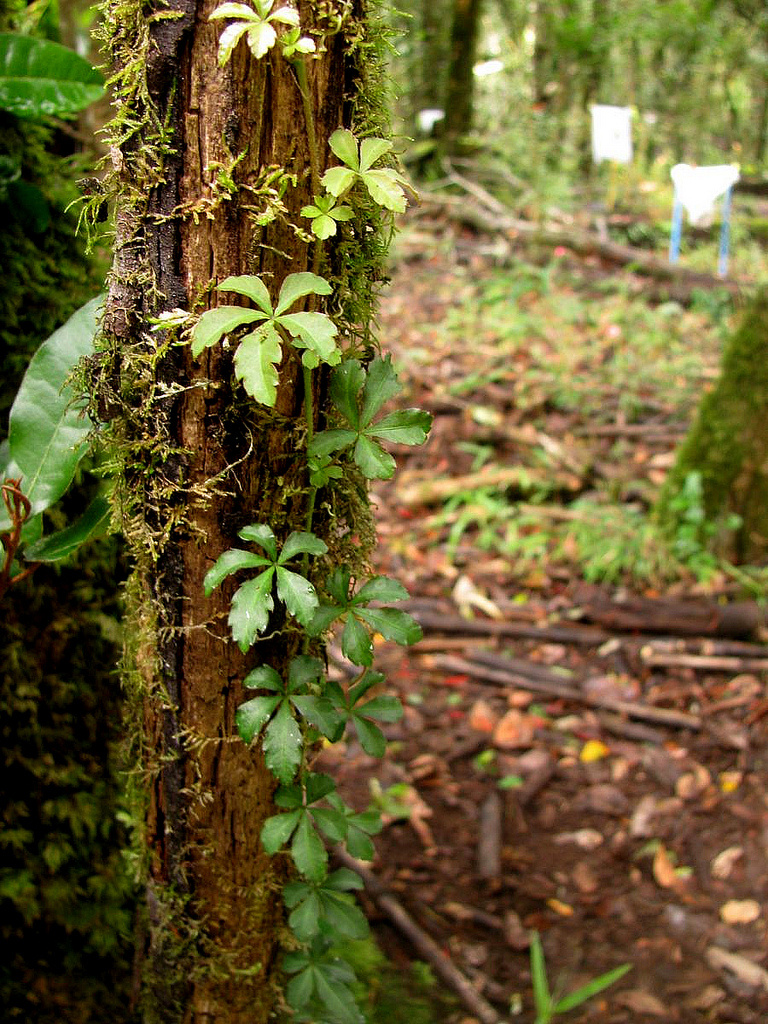

Scientific classification
- Kingdom: Plantae
- Clade: Tracheophytes
- Clade: Angiosperms
- Clade: Eudicots
- Clade: Rosids
- Order: Vitales
- Family: Vitaceae
- Genus: Clematicissus
- Species: C. striata

Binomial name
- Clematicissus striata (Ruiz & Pav.) Lombardi

Synonyms
- Ampelopsis striata (Ruiz & Pav.) Beissn., Schelle & Zabel; Cissus striata Ruiz & Pav.; Vitis striata (Ruiz & Pav.) Miq.

= Clematicissus striata =

Species of vine

Clematicissus striata is a species of climbing plant in the family Vitaceae. The plant is found in south-central Chile (Coquimbo to Magallanes regions), Argentina, Brazil, Uruguay, Paraguay and Bolivia. It has a woody stem that looks reddish as it ages. Its leaves are composed by five folioles in a palmated shape.
