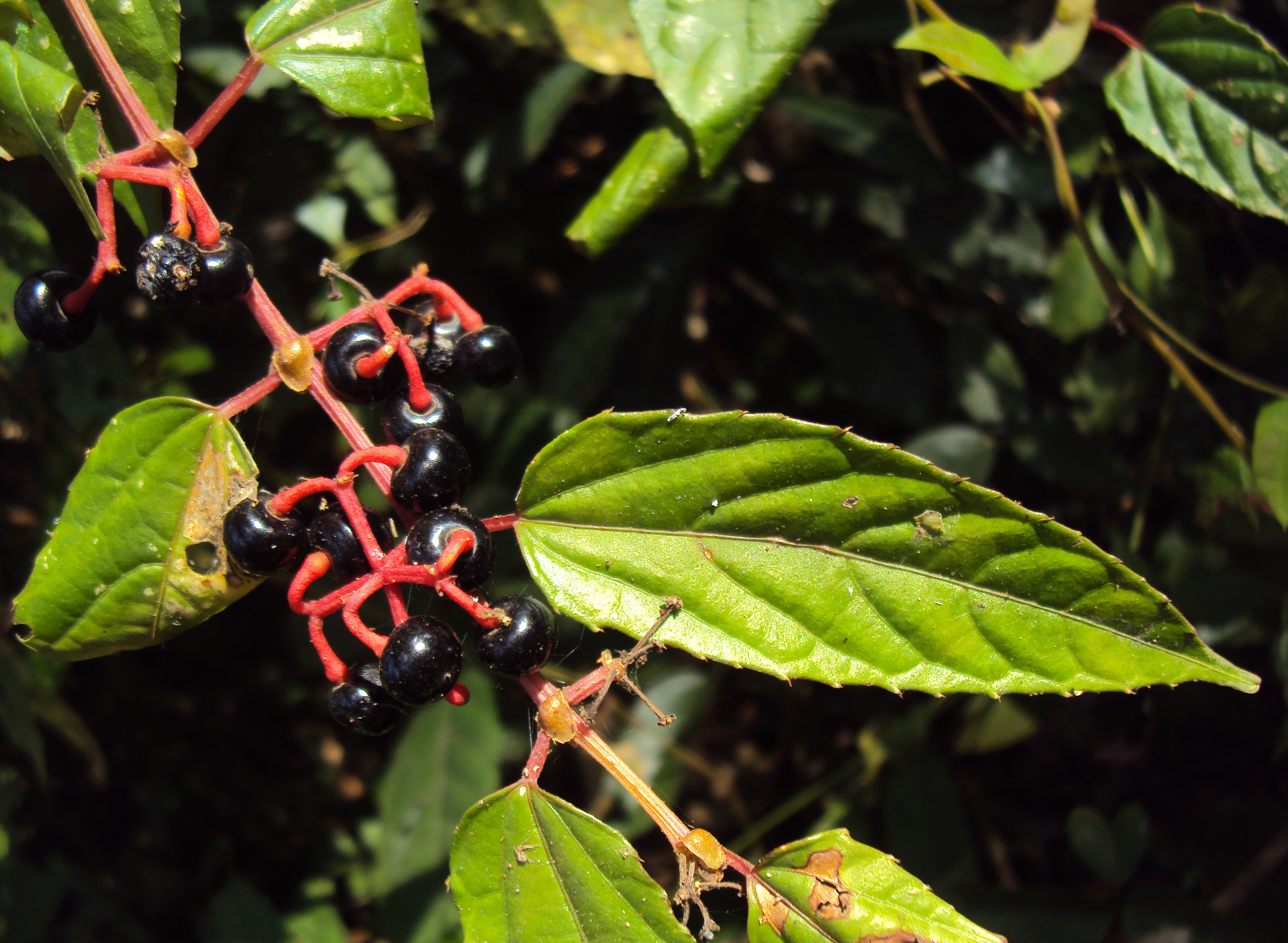
- Leaves and fruit of Cayratia saponaria

Scientific classification
- Kingdom: Plantae
- Clade: Tracheophytes
- Clade: Angiosperms
- Clade: Eudicots
- Clade: Rosids
- Order: Vitales
- Family: Vitaceae
- Genus: Cayratia
- Species: C. saponaria

Binomial name
- Cayratia saponaria (Seem. ex Benth.) Domin

Synonyms
- Cayratia strigosa (F.M.Bailey) Domin; Cissus bicolor Domin; Cissus saponaria (Seem. ex Benth.) Planch.; Vitis saponaria Seem. ex Benth. (1863) (basionym); Vitis strigosa F.M.Bailey

= Cayratia saponaria =

Species of vine

Cayratia saponaria is a species of flowering plant in the family Vitaceae. It is a climbing vine native to New Guinea, the Bismarck Archipelago, Solomon Islands, Vanuatu, and northern Queensland.
