= Vitis adenoclada =

Scientific classification
- Kingdom: Plantae
- Clade: Tracheophytes
- Clade: Angiosperms
- Clade: Eudicots
- Clade: Rosids
- Order: Vitales
- Family: Vitaceae
- Genus: Vitis
- Species: V. adenoclada

Binomial name
- Vitis adenoclada Hand.-Mazz.

Species of vine

Vitis adenoclada is a species of plant in the grape family. It is found in the province of Hunan in China, where the climate is temperate.
