= Nothocissus =

Scientific classification
- Kingdom: Plantae
- Clade: Tracheophytes
- Clade: Angiosperms
- Clade: Eudicots
- Clade: Rosids
- Order: Vitales
- Family: Vitaceae
- Subfamily: Vitoideae
- Tribe: Viteae
- Genus: Nothocissus (Miq.) Latiff
- Species: N. spicifera

Binomial name
- Nothocissus spicifera (Griff.) Latiff

Synonyms
- Ampelocissus spicifera (Griff.) Planch.; Cissus spicifera Griff. (1854) (basionym); Vitis macrostachya Miq.; Vitis spicifera (Griff.) Kuntze

Genus of vines

Nothocissus is a genus of flowering plants in the family Vitaceae. It contains a single species, Nothocissus spicifera, a liana native to Peninsular Thailand, Peninsular Malaysia, Borneo, and Sumatra.
