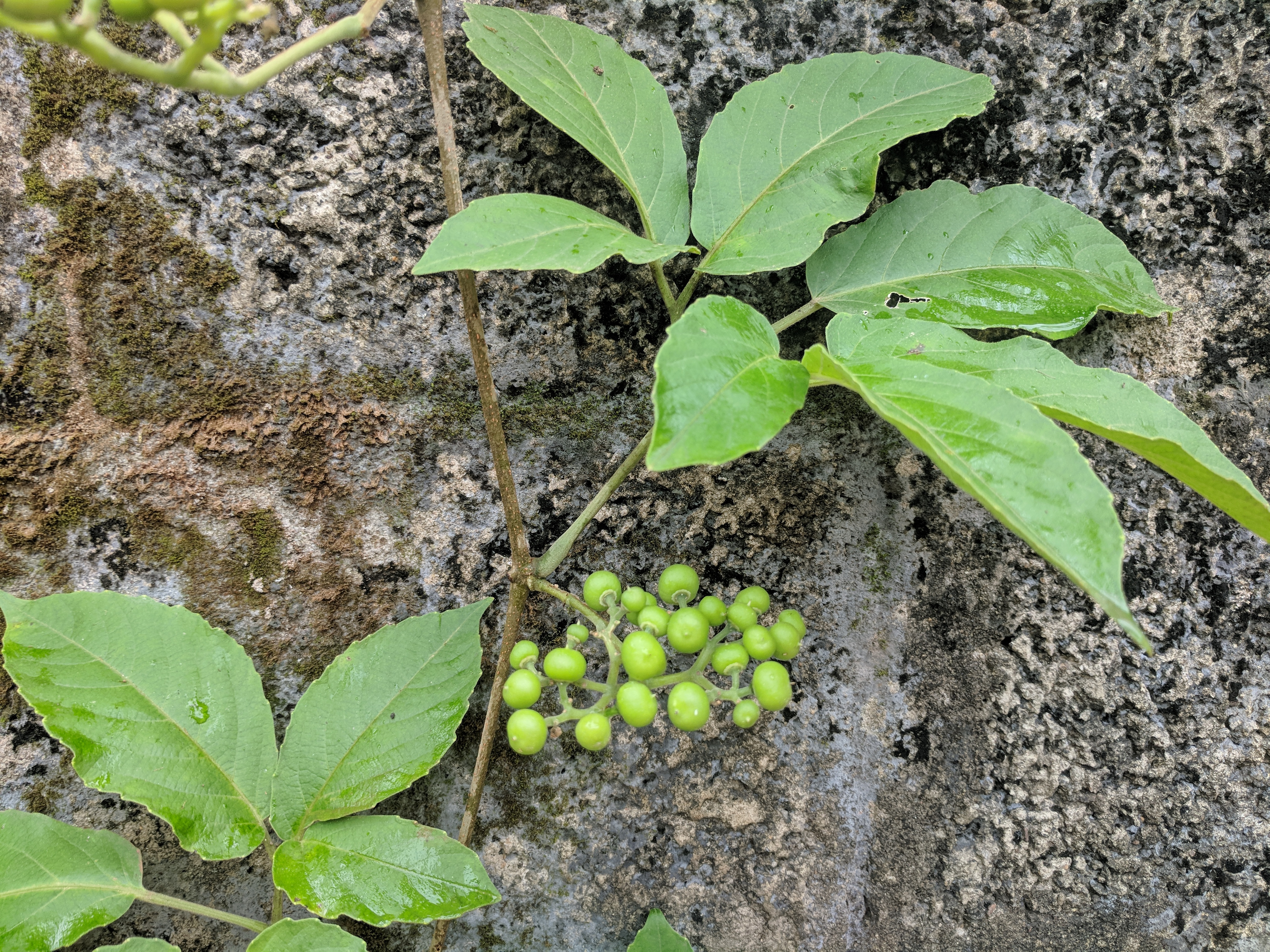
- Cayratia pedata

Scientific classification
- Kingdom: Plantae
- Clade: Tracheophytes
- Clade: Angiosperms
- Clade: Eudicots
- Clade: Rosids
- Order: Vitales
- Family: Vitaceae
- Subfamily: Vitoideae
- Tribe: Cayratieae; Wen J, Lu LM, Nie ZI, Liu XQ, Zhang N, Ickert-Bond S, Gerrath J, Manchester SR, Boggan J, Chen ZD, 2018

= Cayratieae =

Genus of vines

The Cayratieae is one of five tribes of vine plants that are now recognised in this subfamily Vitoideae. It contains genera restored or newly erected from species in the previously configured genus Cayratia, which was found not be monophyletic: (i.e. distinct from Cayratia pedata: the type species of that genus).

== Genera ==
1. Acareosperma Gagnep. – Laos
2. Afrocayratia J.Wen, L.M.Lu, Rabarij. & Z.D.Chen – Tropical & Subtropical Africa, Yemen, Mayotte, Madagascar
3. Causonis Raf. – Tropical & Subtropical Asia to SW Pacific
4. Cayratia Juss. – Tropical & Subtropical Asia to W Pacific
5. Cyphostemma (Planch.) Alston – Tropical & S Africa to Indochina
6. Pseudocayratia J.Wen, L.M.Lu & Z.D.Chen – E Asia: Japan to Vietnam
7. Tetrastigma (Miq.) Planch. – Tropical & Subtropical Asia to SW Pacific
