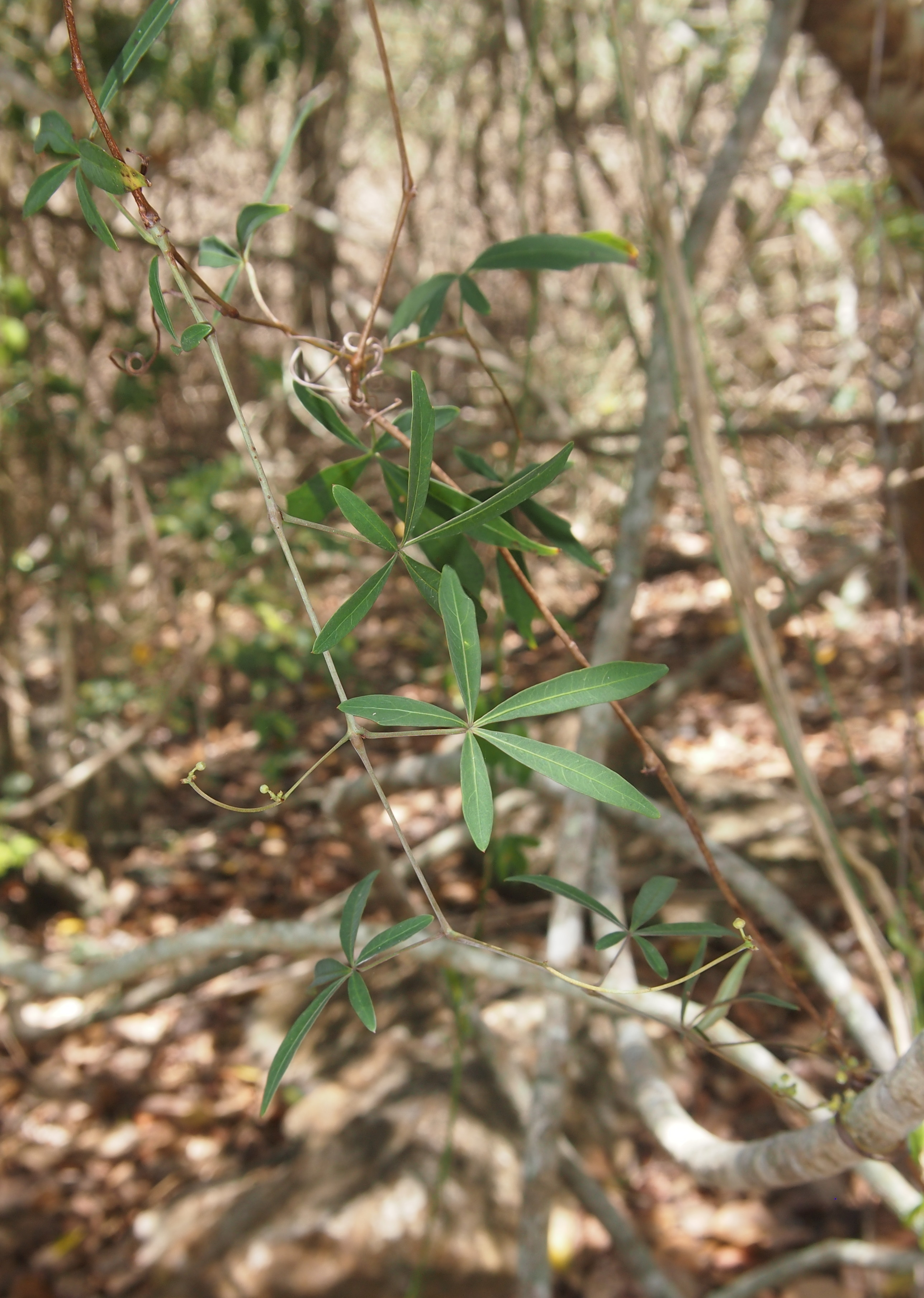

Scientific classification
- Kingdom: Plantae
- Clade: Tracheophytes
- Clade: Angiosperms
- Clade: Eudicots
- Clade: Rosids
- Order: Vitales
- Family: Vitaceae
- Genus: Clematicissus
- Species: C. opaca

Binomial name
- Clematicissus opaca (F.Muell.) Jackes & Rossetto

Synonyms
- Cissus opaca F.Muell.

= Clematicissus opaca =

Species of vine

Clematicissus opaca, called small-leaf grape, pepper vine, small-leaved water vine, yaloone and wappo wappo, is a small vine endemic to Australia. Pepper vine is naturally found in rocky locales in monsoon forest, littoral rainforest and open forest, and is occasionally grown as a garden plant. The plant is primarily restricted to coastal and sub-coastal regions in Queensland and New South Wales, although it does occur inland, west of the Great Dividing Range, in central New South Wales.

Clematicissus opaca is a relatively small vine, with stems of 6 metres or less. The leaves are palmate, with the central leaflets larger than the lateral. Leaf shape and size is highly variable, both between plants and on individual plants. Leaves may have as few as three leaflets or as many as seven. Leaflets may be sessile or attached via a petiole. Leaflets may be elliptical, ovate or narrow lanceolate. Leaf margins may be entire or toothed.

Clematicissus opaca was once classified as Cissus opaca, however a combination of genetic and morphological features led to it being placed within the genus Clematicissus. As with the closely related Cissus, the vines climb by means of tendrils produced opposite each leaf. Minute flowers are produced on inflorescences that arise from branches of these tendrils. Flowers are followed by globular, black fruit, approximately 15 mm in diameter. These fruit are edible, though not especially palatable, and were occasionally used as food by Aborigines.

Clematicissus opaca produces tuberous roots, from which the plants can resprout following fire or grazing. These roots were used as food by Aboriginal Australians.

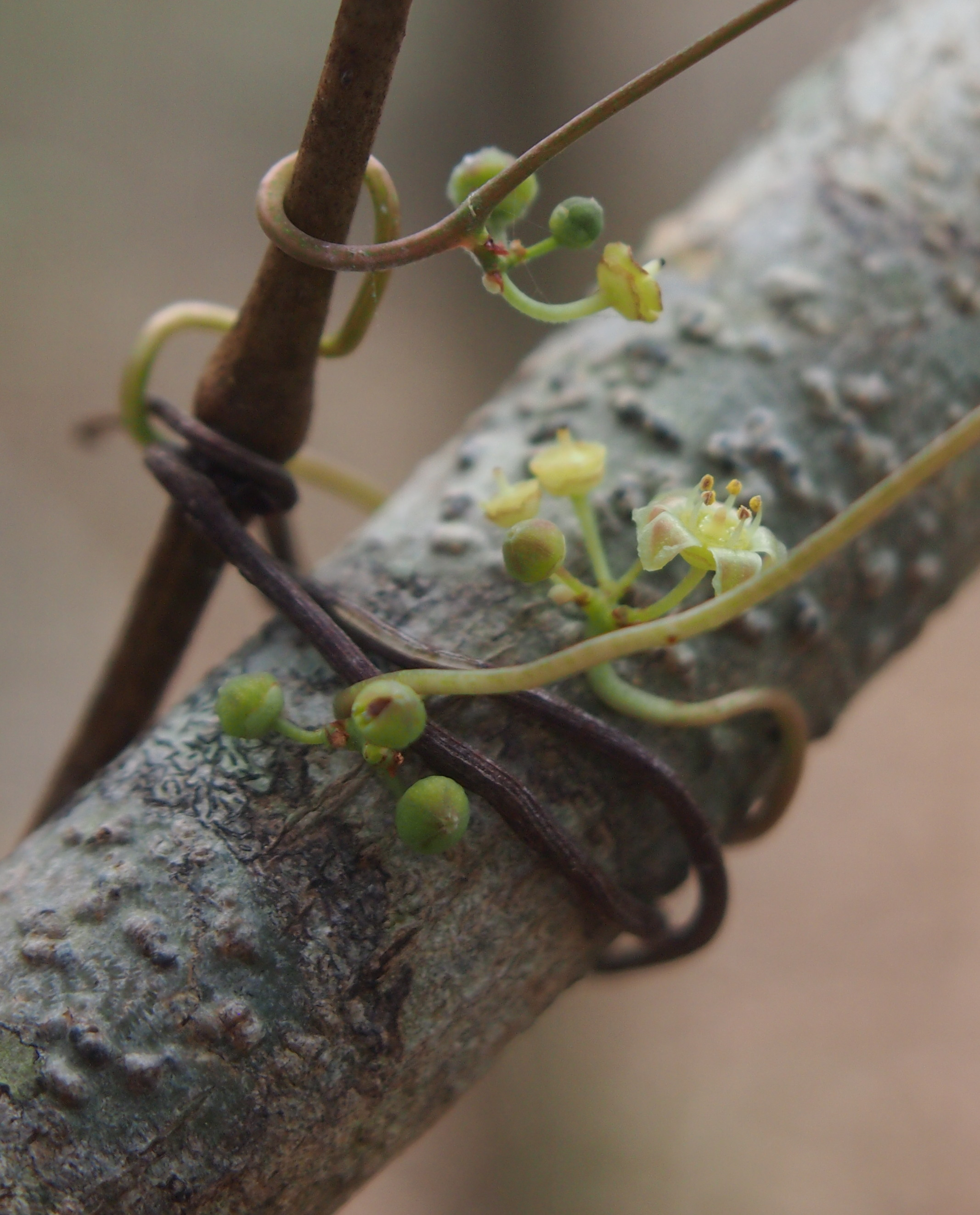
Flowers
