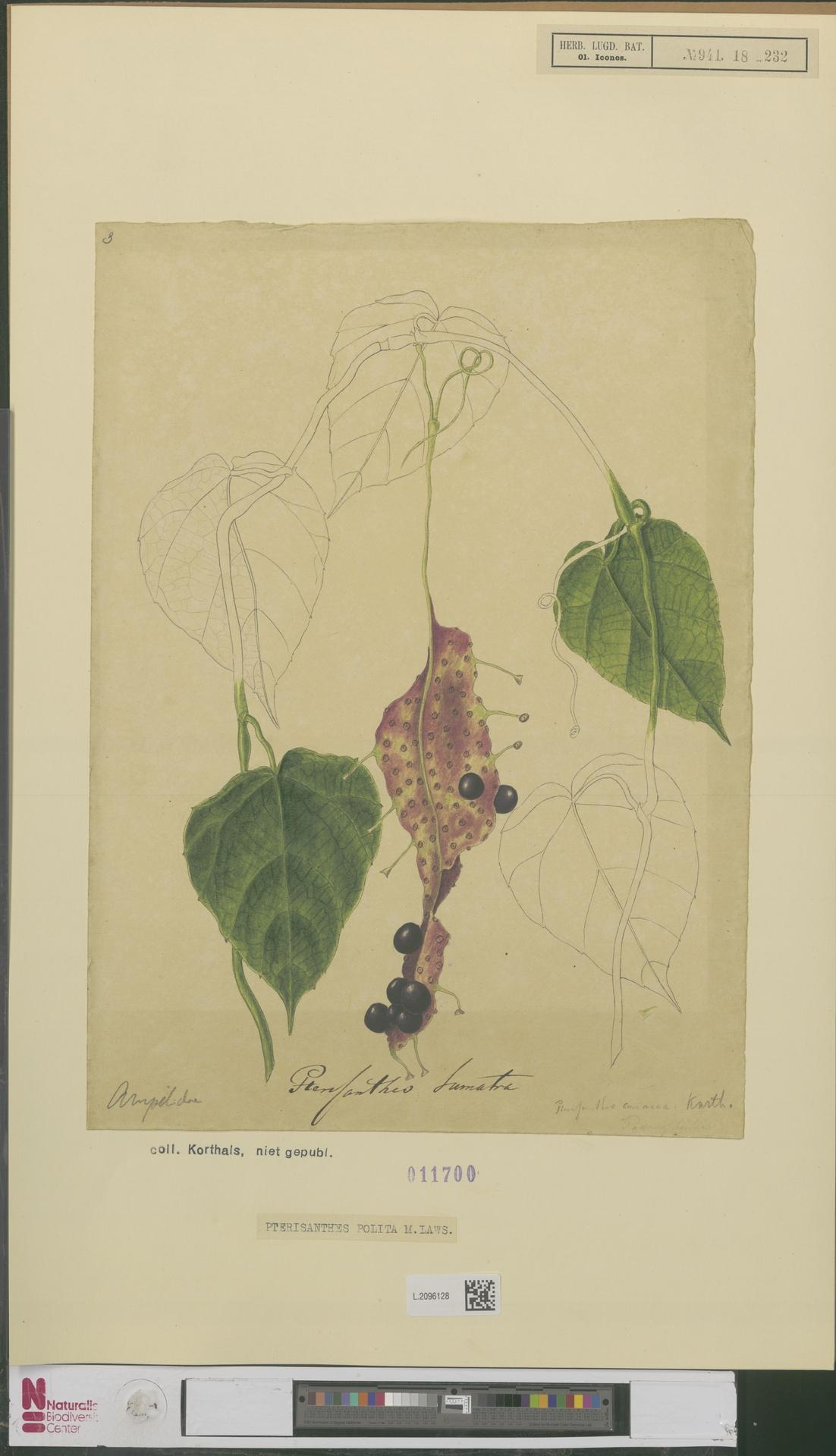

Scientific classification
- Kingdom: Plantae
- Clade: Tracheophytes
- Clade: Angiosperms
- Clade: Eudicots
- Clade: Rosids
- Order: Vitales
- Family: Vitaceae
- Subfamily: Vitoideae
- Genus: Pterisanthes; Blume, 1825

Synonyms
- Embamma Griff.

= Pterisanthes =

Genus of vines

Pterisanthes is a vine plant genus in the subfamily Vitoideae. Its native range is Indochina to W. Malesia including the Philippines. The relationship between Pterisanthes and Ampelocissus has been debated, with Pterisanthes retained.

== Species ==
Plants of the World Online currently includes:

1. Pterisanthes beccariana Planch.
2. Pterisanthes brevipedicellata Latiff
3. Pterisanthes caudigera (Griff.) Planch.
4. Pterisanthes cissioides Blume
5. Pterisanthes dalhousiae Planch.
6. Pterisanthes eriopoda (Miq.) Planch.
7. Pterisanthes glabra Ridl.
8. Pterisanthes grandis Ridl.
9. Pterisanthes heterantha (Griff.) M.A.Lawson
10. Pterisanthes miquelii Planch.
11. Pterisanthes pedata M.A.Lawson
12. Pterisanthes polita (Miq.) M.A.Lawson
13. Pterisanthes pulchra Ridl.
14. Pterisanthes quinquefoliolata Merr.
15. Pterisanthes rufula (Miq.) Planch.
16. Pterisanthes stonei Latiff
17. Pterisanthes sumatrana Latiff
