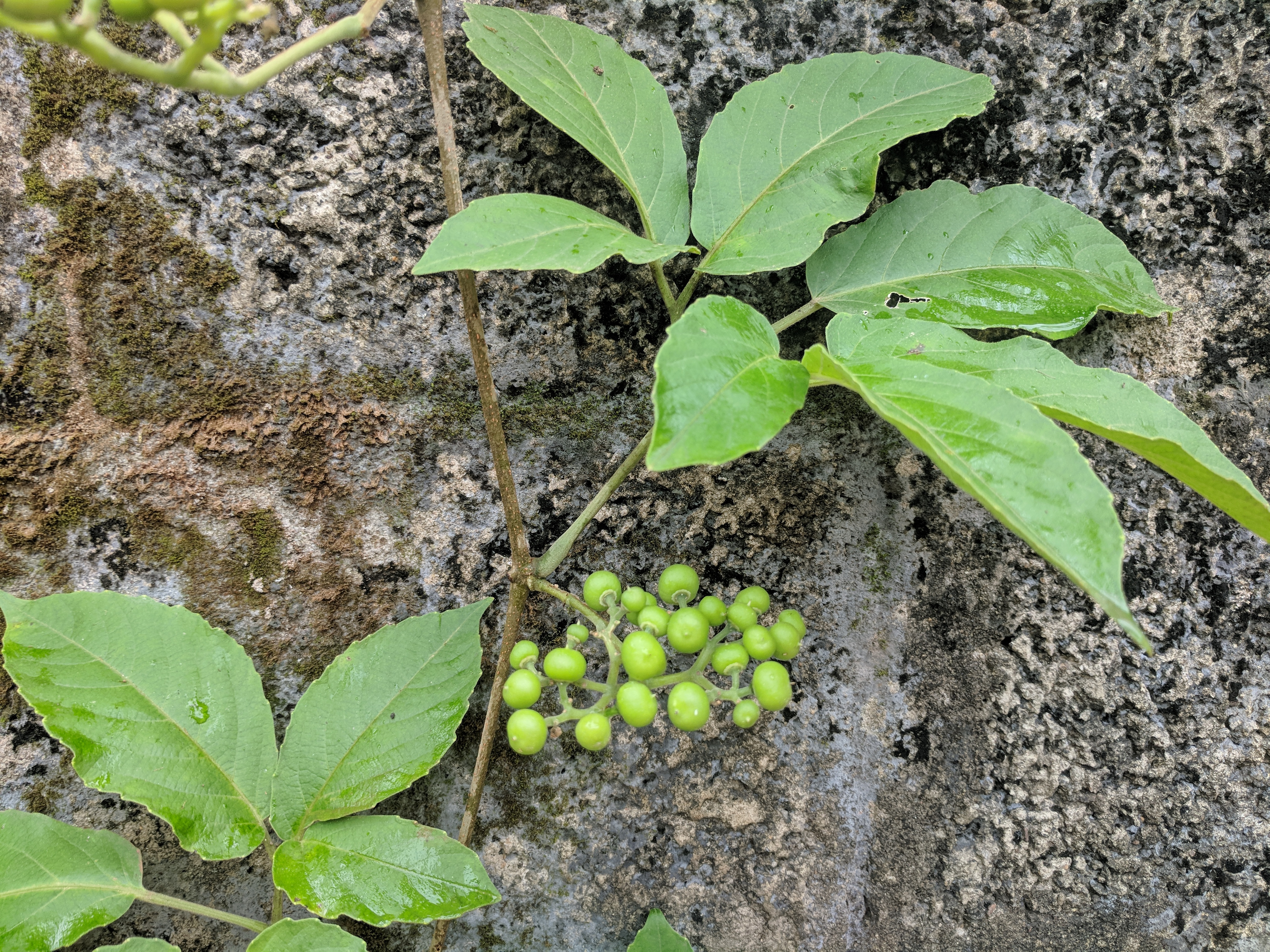

Conservation status
- Vulnerable (IUCN 3.1)

Scientific classification
- Kingdom: Plantae
- Clade: Tracheophytes
- Clade: Angiosperms
- Clade: Eudicots
- Clade: Rosids
- Order: Vitales
- Family: Vitaceae
- Genus: Cayratia
- Species: C. pedata

Binomial name
- Cayratia pedata (Lam.) Juss. ex Gagnep.

Synonyms
- Cissus pedata Lam.; Vitis pedata (Lam.) Vahl ex Wall.

= Cayratia pedata =

Species of vine

Cayratia pedata, popularly known as birdfoot grapevine, is a species of flowering plant in the family Vitaceae.

== Description ==
Cayratia pedata is a woody climber with a cylindrical stem that grows primarily in the wet tropical biome. It has wiry, coiled tendrils and leaves divided into five to seven smooth, toothed leaflets. The small greenish-yellow to whitish-yellow flowers, about 3 mm across, are borne in branched clusters up to 10 cm (3.9 in) long. The fruits are round, creamy-white berries, each containing one or two flat, semicircular seeds.

== Flowering ==
March to June.

== Distribution ==
The native range of the species is India to China (Yunnan, Guangxi) and Jawa.

== Uses ==
Leaf is used in the treatment of ulcers, inflammation, and scabies. The extract of the plant contains significant amounts of alkaloids, tannins, phenolic compounds, flavonoids, and terpenoids.
