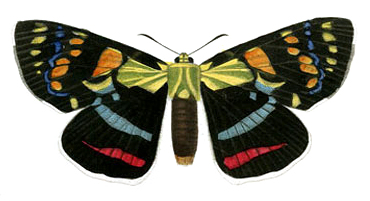
- Agarista agricola

Scientific classification
- Domain: Eukaryota
- Kingdom: Animalia
- Phylum: Arthropoda
- Class: Insecta
- Order: Lepidoptera
- Superfamily: Noctuoidea
- Family: Noctuidae
- Subfamily: Agaristinae
- Genus: Agarista; Leach, 1814

= Agarista (moth) =

Genus of moths

Agarista is a genus of moths in the family Noctuidae. The genus was erected by William Elford Leach in 1814..

== Species ==
- Agarista agricola - Joseph's coat moth Donovan, 1805
  - Syn. Agarista picta
  - Agarista agricola biformis Butler, 1884
  - Agarista agricola timorensis Rothschild, 1896
  - Agarista agricola daemonis Butler, 1876
- Agarista hesperoides Walker, 1856
