= Afrocayratia debilis =

Scientific classification
- Kingdom: Plantae
- Clade: Tracheophytes
- Clade: Angiosperms
- Clade: Eudicots
- Clade: Rosids
- Order: Vitales
- Family: Vitaceae
- Genus: Afrocayratia
- Species: A. debilis

Binomial name
- Afrocayratia debilis (Baker) J.Wen & L.M.Lu

Synonyms
- Cayratia debilis (Baker) Suess.; Cissus debilis (Baker) Planch.; Vitis debilis Baker

Species of plant

Afrocayratia debilis is a species of flowering plant in the grapevine family Vitaceae, native to equatorial Africa. It has herbaceous or slightly woody vines, with 5-foliate leaves and greenish-white to yellow flowers. Its stem, leaves, and sap are used in traditional medicine in various African countries, and the leaves are eaten as a vegetable on the island of Bioko. Its fruits are inedible, although they are fed to poultry in the Central African Republic to protect from influenza and coccidiosis.
