= Yua (plant) =

Scientific classification
- Kingdom: Plantae
- Clade: Tracheophytes
- Clade: Angiosperms
- Clade: Eudicots
- Clade: Rosids
- Order: Vitales
- Family: Vitaceae
- Subfamily: Vitoideae
- Genus: Yua; C.L. Li

Species of vine

Yua is a small genus of vines in the family Vitaceae, native to Nepal, S. China, Taiwan and Vietnam.

== Species ==
The genus Yua includes:

- Yua austro-orientalis (F.P.Metcalf) C.L.Li
- Yua thomsonii (M.A.Lawson) C.L.Li (synonym Yua chinensis C.L.Li)
