= Acareosperma =

Scientific classification
- Kingdom: Plantae
- Clade: Tracheophytes
- Clade: Angiosperms
- Clade: Eudicots
- Clade: Rosids
- Order: Vitales
- Family: Vitaceae
- Tribe: Cayratieae
- Genus: Acareosperma; Gagnep.
- Species: A. spireanum

Binomial name
- Acareosperma spireanum Gagnep.

Genus of vines

Acareosperma is a plant genus in the family Vitaceae. The sole species is Acareosperma spireanum.

== Distribution ==
A. spireanum is an endemic species found in Laos, Asia.
