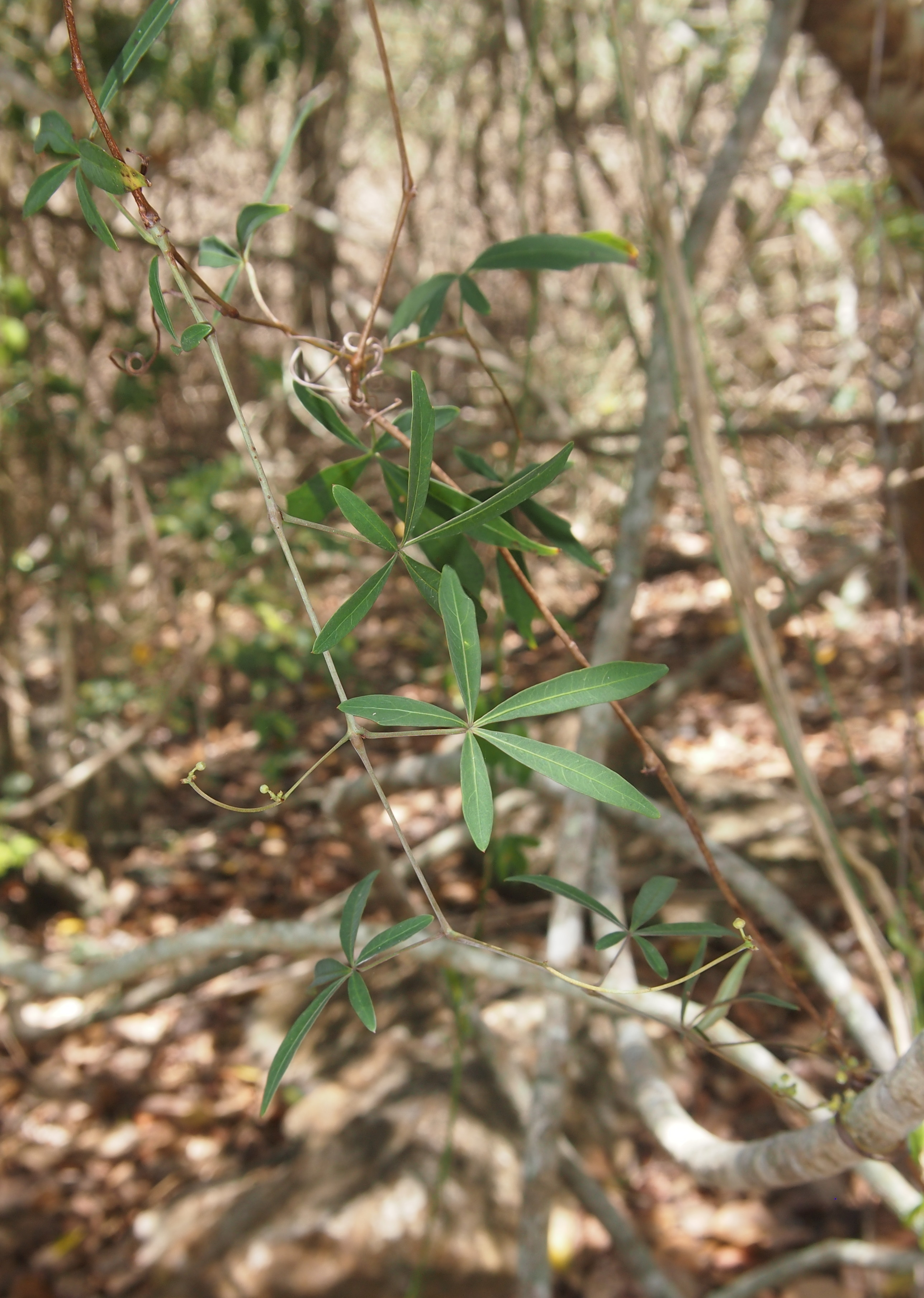
- Clematicissus opaca

Scientific classification
- Kingdom: Plantae
- Clade: Tracheophytes
- Clade: Angiosperms
- Clade: Eudicots
- Clade: Rosids
- Order: Vitales
- Family: Vitaceae
- Subfamily: Vitoideae
- Genus: Clematicissus; Planch.

Type species
- Clematicissus angustissima (F. Muell.) Planch.

= Clematicissus =

Genus of vines

Clematicissus is a genus of flowering plants in the family Vitaceae, native to South America and Australia.

== Species ==
The following species are recognised in the genus Clematicissus:

- Clematicissus angustissima (F.Muell.) Planch.
- Clematicissus granulosa (Ruiz & Pav.) Lombardi
- Clematicissus opaca (F.Muell.) Jackes & Rossetto
- Clematicissus pruinata (Weinm.) C.A.Zanotti & Panizza
- Clematicissus striata (Ruiz & Pav.) Lombardi
- Clematicissus tweedieana (Baker) Lombardi
