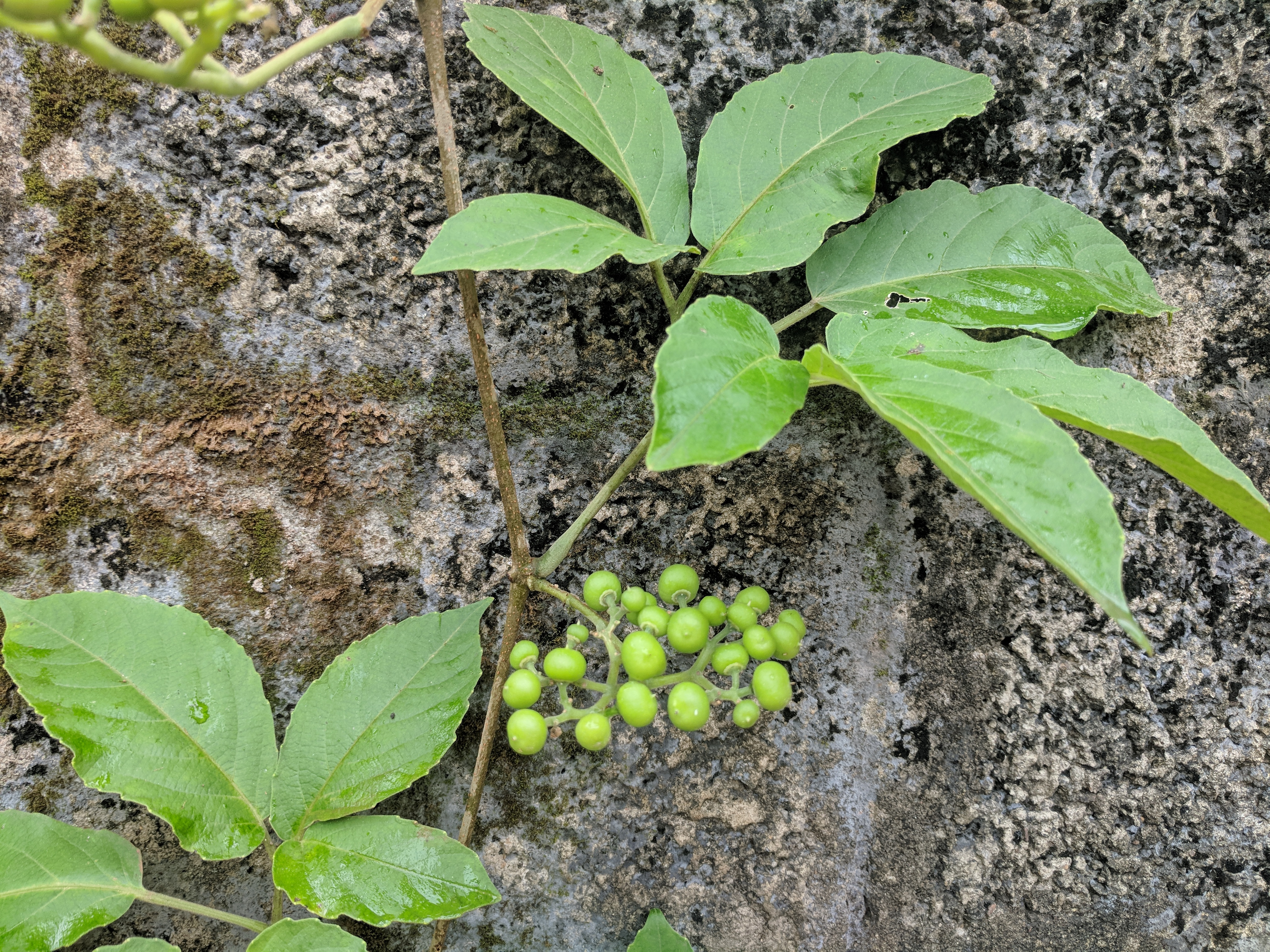
- Cayratia pedata

Scientific classification
- Kingdom: Plantae
- Clade: Tracheophytes
- Clade: Angiosperms
- Clade: Eudicots
- Clade: Rosids
- Order: Vitales
- Family: Vitaceae
- Subfamily: Vitoideae
- Tribe: Cayratieae
- Genus: Cayratia (Baker) Suess.

Species
- See text

= Cayratia =

Genus of vines

Cayratia is a genus of flowering plants in the family Vitaceae. It consists of species of vine plants, typical of the tribe Cayratieae. Some of them are used by humans, and they are found in tropical and subtropical areas of Asia, Africa, Australia, and islands of the Pacific Ocean.

Within the Vitaceae, Cayratia is most closely related to Tetrastigma and Cyphostemma. As previously configured, the genus Cayratia was found not be monophyletic (for example, C. japonica was moved to Causonis being distinct from Cayratia pedata, the type species).

== Species ==
Plants of the World Online currently includes:

1. Cayratia acris (F.Muell.) Domin
2. Cayratia acuminata (A.Gray) A.C.Sm.
3. Cayratia albifolia C.L.Li
4. Cayratia anemonifolia (Zipp. ex Miq.) Suess.
5. Cayratia apoensis (Elmer) Quisumb.
6. Cayratia calcicola Domin
7. Cayratia cambodiana Gagnep.
8. Cayratia cardiophylla Jackes
9. Cayratia cardiospermoides (Planch. ex Franch.) Gagnep.
10. Cayratia ceratophora Gagnep.
11. Cayratia cheniana L.M.Lu & J.Wen
12. Cayratia ciliifera (Merr.) Chun
13. Cayratia coi J.Wen & Boggan
14. Cayratia cordifolia C.Y.Wu ex C.L.Li
15. Cayratia cumingiana (Turcz.) Galet
16. Cayratia cuneata Domin
17. Cayratia daliensis C.L.Li
18. Cayratia debilis (Baker) Suess.
19. Cayratia delicatula (Willems) Desc.
20. Cayratia emarginata Trias-Blasi & J.Parn.
21. Cayratia fugongensis C.L.Li
22. Cayratia gracilis (Guill. & Perr.) Suess.
23. Cayratia hayatae Gagnep.
24. Cayratia ibuensis (Hook.f.) Suess.
25. Cayratia imerinensis (Baker) Desc.
26. Cayratia irosinensis (Elmer) Galet
27. Cayratia lanceolata (C.L.Li) J.Wen & Z.D.Chen
28. Cayratia lineata (Warb.) Merr. & L.M.Perry
29. Cayratia longiflora Desc.
30. Cayratia medoensis C.L.Li
31. Cayratia megacarpa (Lauterb.) Merr. & L.M.Perry
32. Cayratia melananthera Gagnep.
33. Cayratia menglaensis C.L.Li
34. Cayratia mollissima (Wall.) Gagnep.
35. Cayratia nervosa (Planch.) Suess.
36. Cayratia novemfolia (Wall. ex M.A.Lawson) Burkill ex Suess.
37. Cayratia palauana (Hosok.) Suess.
38. Cayratia palmata Gagnep.
39. Cayratia pedata (Lam.) Gagnep.
  type species
40. Cayratia pellita Gagnep.
41. Cayratia polydactyla (Miq.) Galet
42. Cayratia reticulata (M.A.Lawson) Mabb.
43. Cayratia ridleyi Suess.
44. Cayratia roxburghii (Planch.) Gagnep.
45. Cayratia saponaria (Seem. ex Benth.) Domin
46. Cayratia schumanniana (Gilg) Suess.
47. Cayratia seemanniana A.C.Sm.
48. Cayratia setulosa (Diels & Gilg) Suess.
49. Cayratia sonneratii Gagnep.
50. Cayratia thalictrifolia (Planch.) Suess.
51. Cayratia timorensis (DC.) C.L.Li
52. Cayratia triternata (Baker) Desc.
