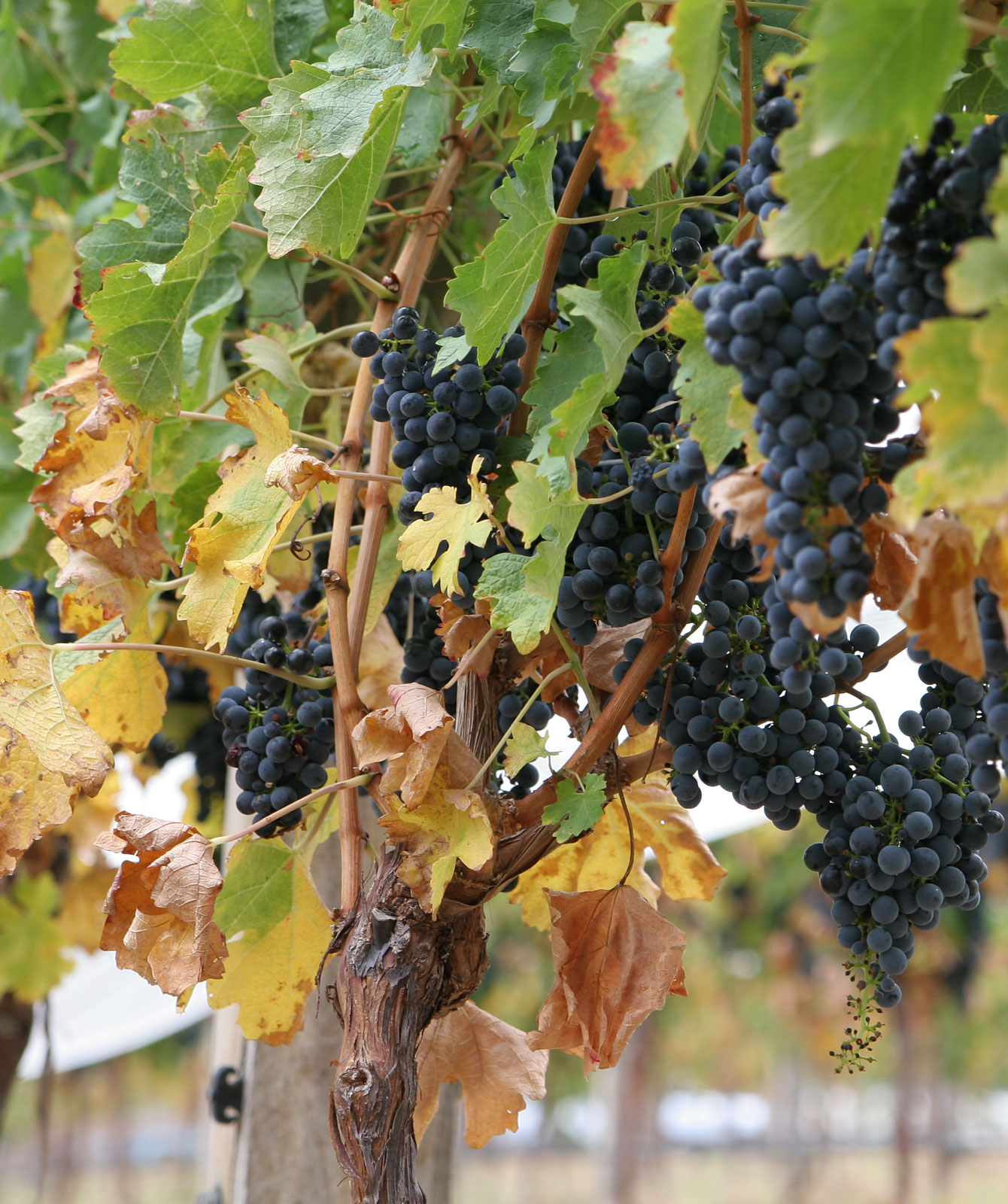
- Vitis vinifera, wine grapes

Scientific classification
- Kingdom: Plantae
- Clade: Tracheophytes
- Clade: Angiosperms
- Clade: Eudicots
- Clade: Rosids
- Order: Vitales; Juss. ex Bercht. & J.Presl
- Family: Vitaceae; Juss., nom. cons.

Synonyms
- Ampelidopsaceae; Ampelopsidaceae; Cissaceae; Leeaceae; Pterisanthaceae; Vintaceae

= Vitaceae =

Vitaceae Temporal range: Maastrichtian–present

Family of flowering plants

The Vitaceae, also called the grape family, is a family of flowering plants that has 20 genera and around 910 known species in its monotypic order Vitales, including common plants such as grapevines (Vitis spp.) and Virginia creeper (Parthenocissus quinquefolia). The family name is derived from the genus Vitis.

Most of its members are distributed in tropical areas and many are dominant climbers with ecological significance, but some could be shrubs or tree. Some species of genus Tetrastigma serve as hosts to parasitic plants in another family Rafflesiaceae. Some produce pearl bodies that may be a defense trait and a food source for arthropods.

In general, members of Vitaceae show a high variety in their chromosome number. The numbers could be used to differentiate species, but the differences in numbers can also make it difficult to hybridize.

The family is economically important as the berries of Vitis species, commonly known as grapes, are an important fruit crop and, when fermented, produce wine.

The extant species of Vitaceae are widespread and so is the fossil record.

== Description ==
Members of Vitaceae are usually climbers with tendrils opposite to their leaves, and they are considered as the most successful climbers among tropical and temperate vegetation. Vitaceae range from vines, lianas (woody vines), to occasionally shrubs or trees and can be succulent. The fruit of Vitaceae is berry. Their leaves are arranged alternately, in simple or compound type, and leave margins are toothed to lobed.

Some species of genus Tetrastigma, such as T. diepenhorstii (Miq.) Latiff and T. rafflesiae, are the hosts of parasitic plants in genus Rafflesia, which belongs to family Rafflesiaceae.

=== Pearl bodies ===
Pearl bodies, or food bodies, are microscopic orbs mostly found on leaves or stems occurred in a variety of plant families, as well as many Vitaceae genera and species, like Cissus and Vitis. Pearl body is often described as a part of the defense mechanism and a source of nutrition for other species, mediating interactions between Vitaceae and their mutualists ants and mites.

== Phylogeny and taxonomy ==
The family name sometimes appears as Vitidaceae, but Vitaceae is a conserved name and therefore has priority over both Vitidaceae and another name sometimes found in the older literature, Ampelidaceae.

In the Cronquist system, APG system, and APG II system, Vitaceae was placed near the family Rhamnaceae, and both families were placed under order Rhamnales.

In APG III system (2009) and APG IV system (2016), the family is placed in its own order, Vitales, and molecular phylogenetic studies consider Vitales as the most basal order in the clade rosids.

Plants of the World Online currently accepts the following genera, and these genera can be placed in two subfamilies, Leeoideae and Vitoideae. The subfamilies are sometimes recognized as separate families. The cladogram below shows the relationships of Vitaceae from its order to subfamilies and tribes.

- Vitales
  - Vitaceae
    - Leeoideae
    - Vitoideae
      - Ampelopsideae
      - Cayratieae
      - Cisseae
      - Parthenocisseae
      - Viteae

=== Leeoideae ===
- Leea D.Royen: The genus was previously placed in its own monotypic family Leeaceae, and is now included in Vitaceae by APG IV (2016) and the Angiosperm Phylogeny Website.
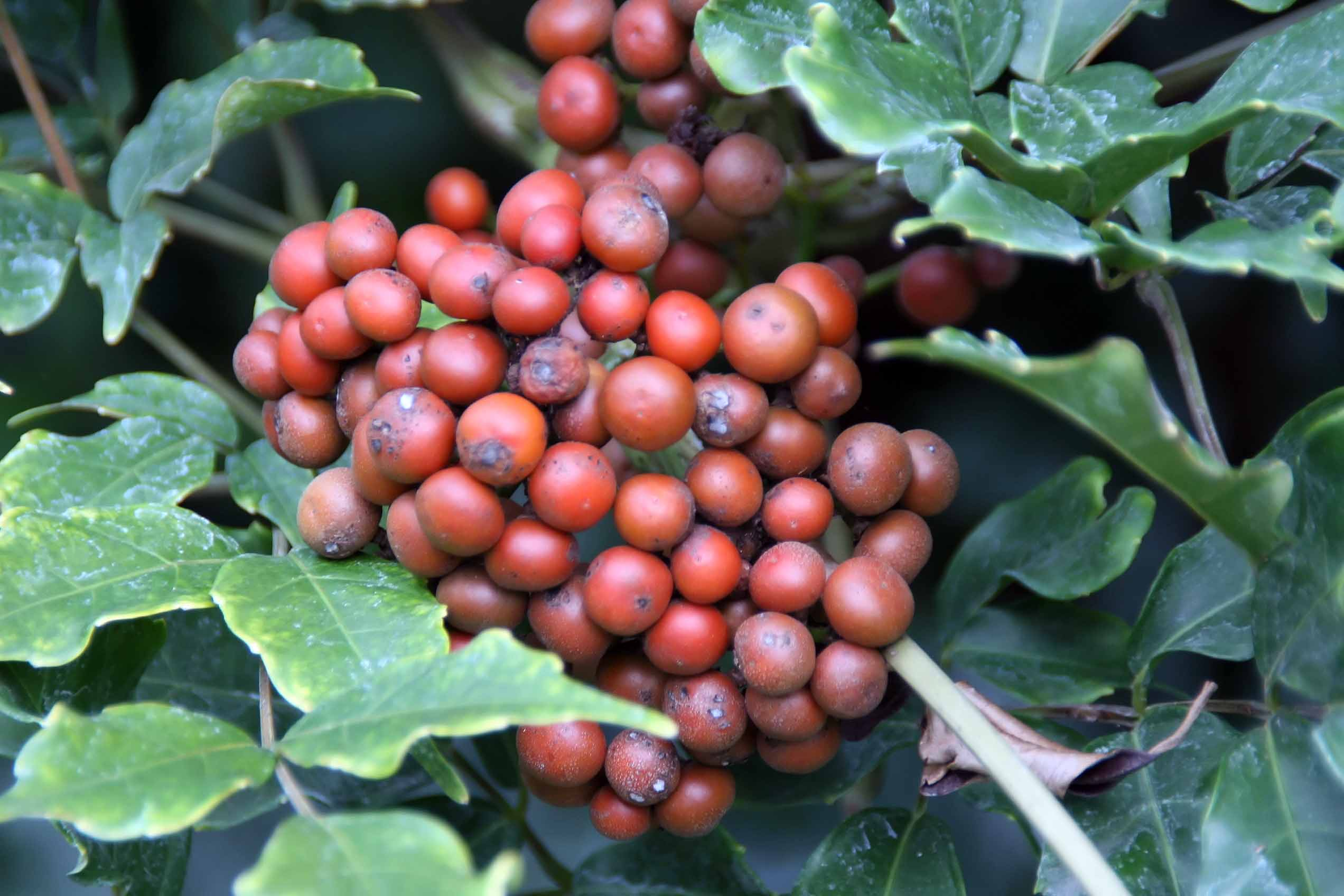
Leea guineensis

=== Vitoideae ===
Five tribes are now recognised in this subfamily:

Ampelopsideae

- Ampelopsis A.Rich. ex Michx. (pepper-vines)
- Clematicissus Planch.
- Nekemias Raf.
- Rhoicissus Planch.
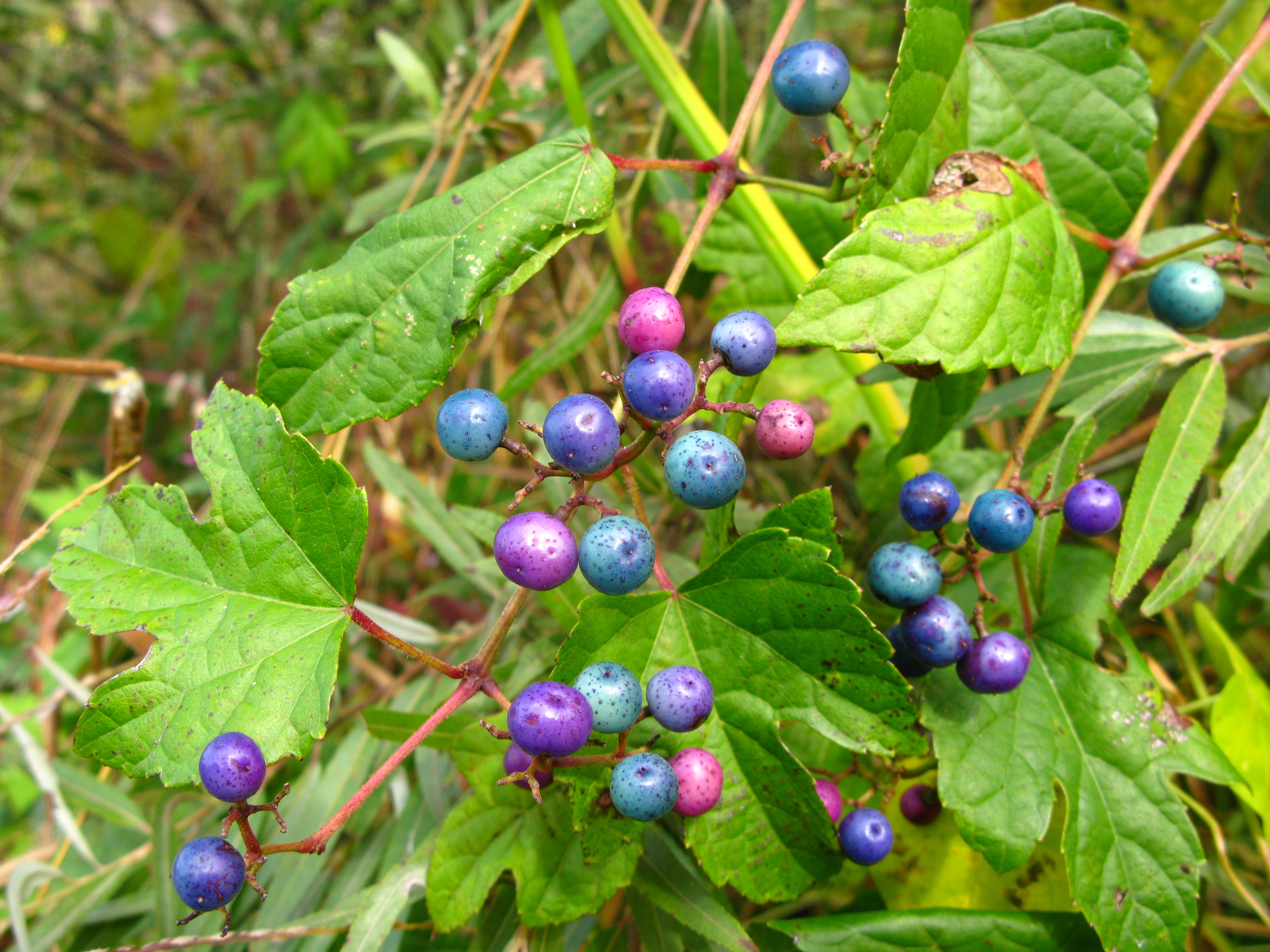
Ampelopsis glandulosa var. heterophylla

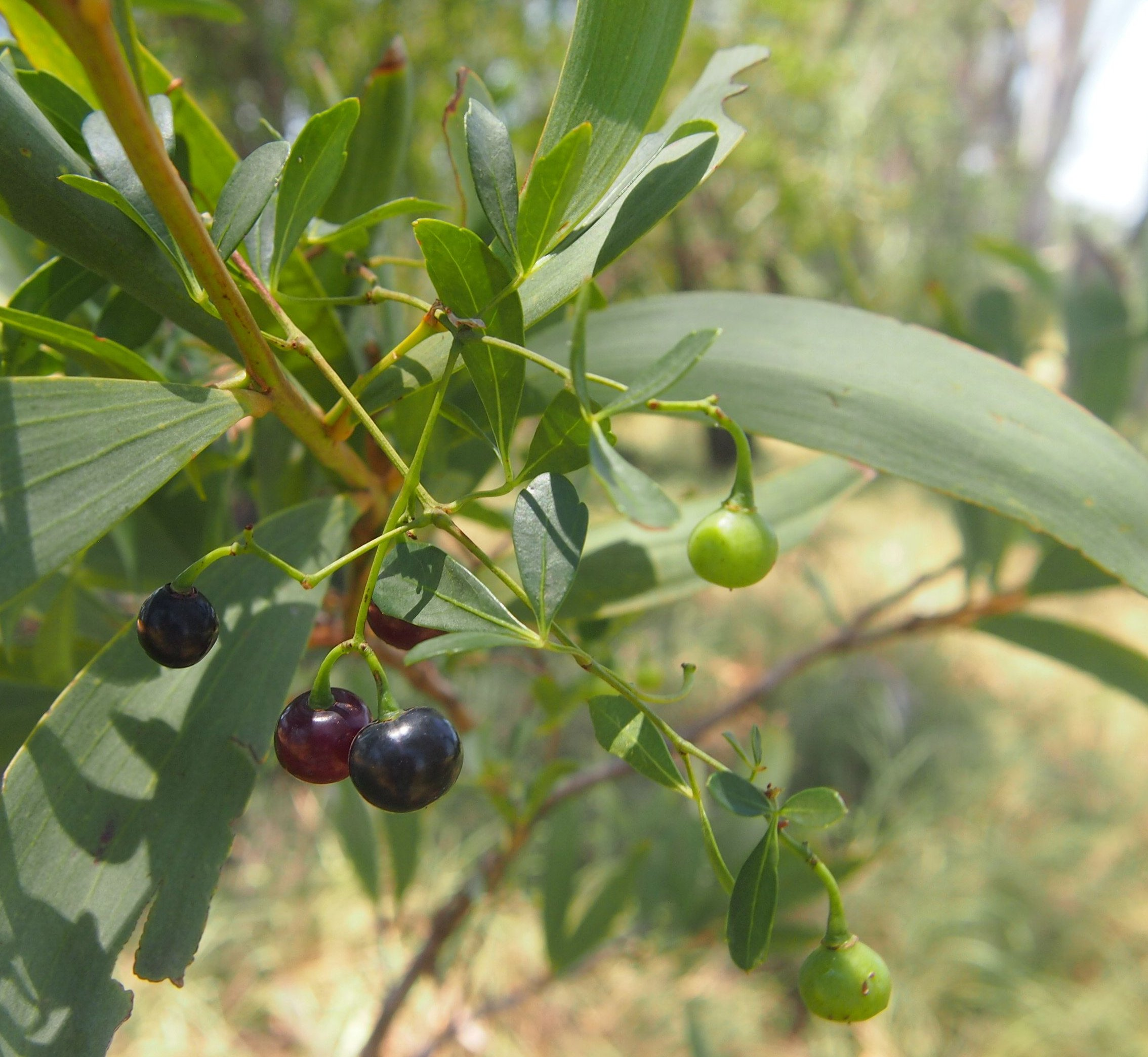
Clematicissus

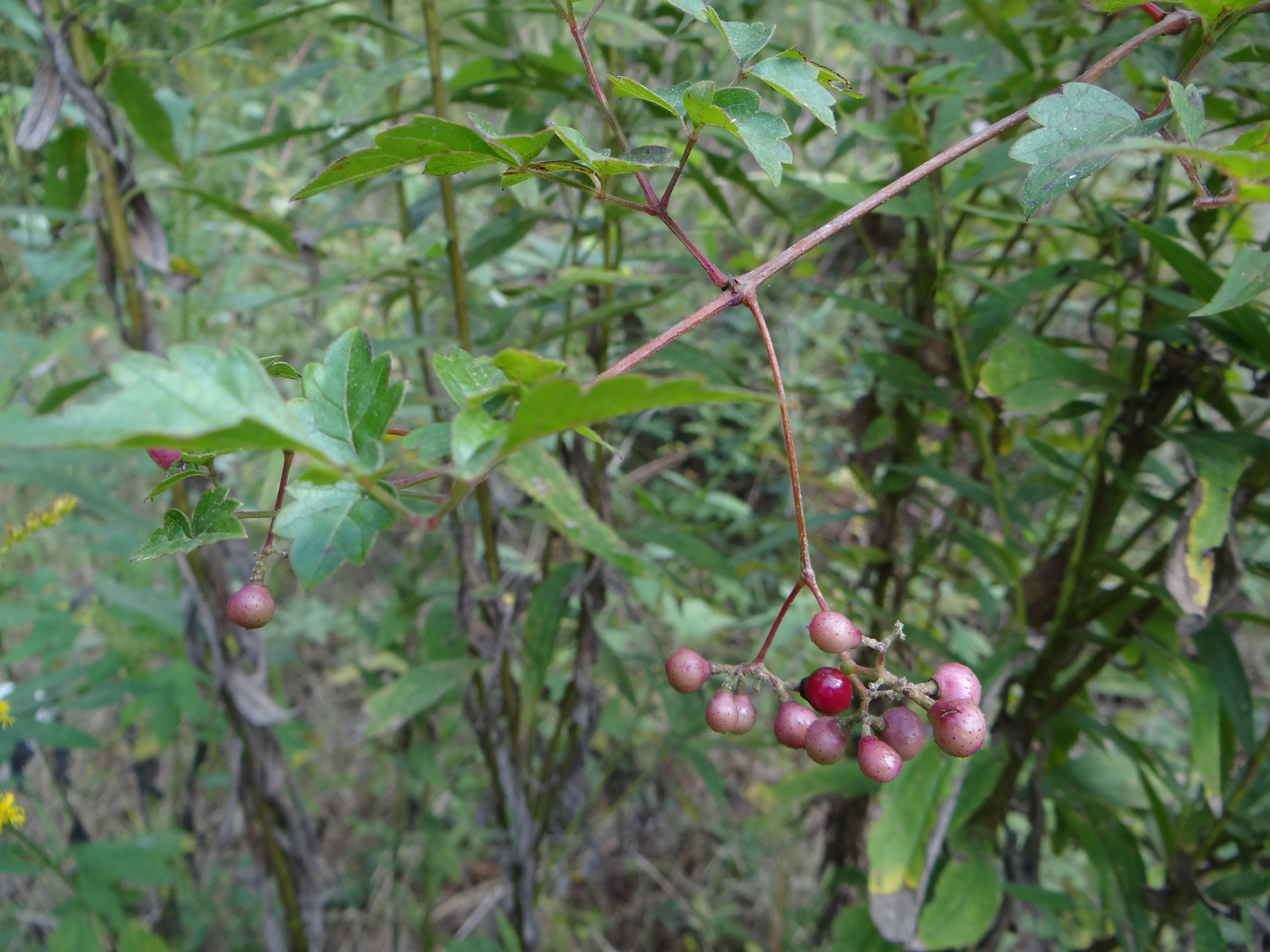
Nekemias arborea

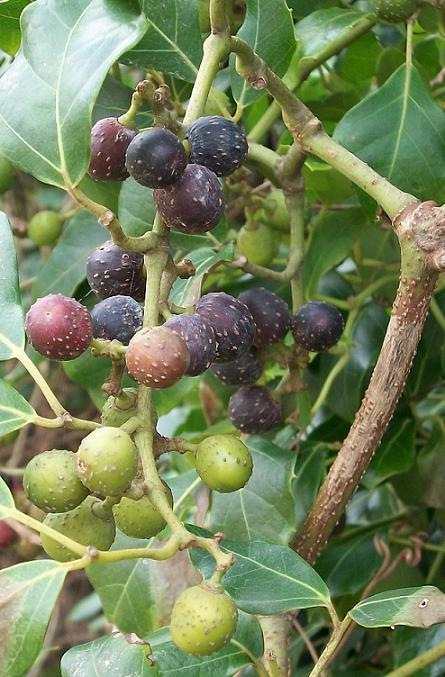
Rhoicissus rhomboidea

Cayratieae

- Acareosperma Gagnep.
- Afrocayratia J.Wen, L.M.Lu, Rabarij. & Z.D.Chen
- Causonis Raf.
- Cayratia Juss.
- Cyphostemma (Planch.) Alston
- Pseudocayratia J.Wen, L.M.Lu & Z.D.Chen
- Tetrastigma (Miq.) Planch.
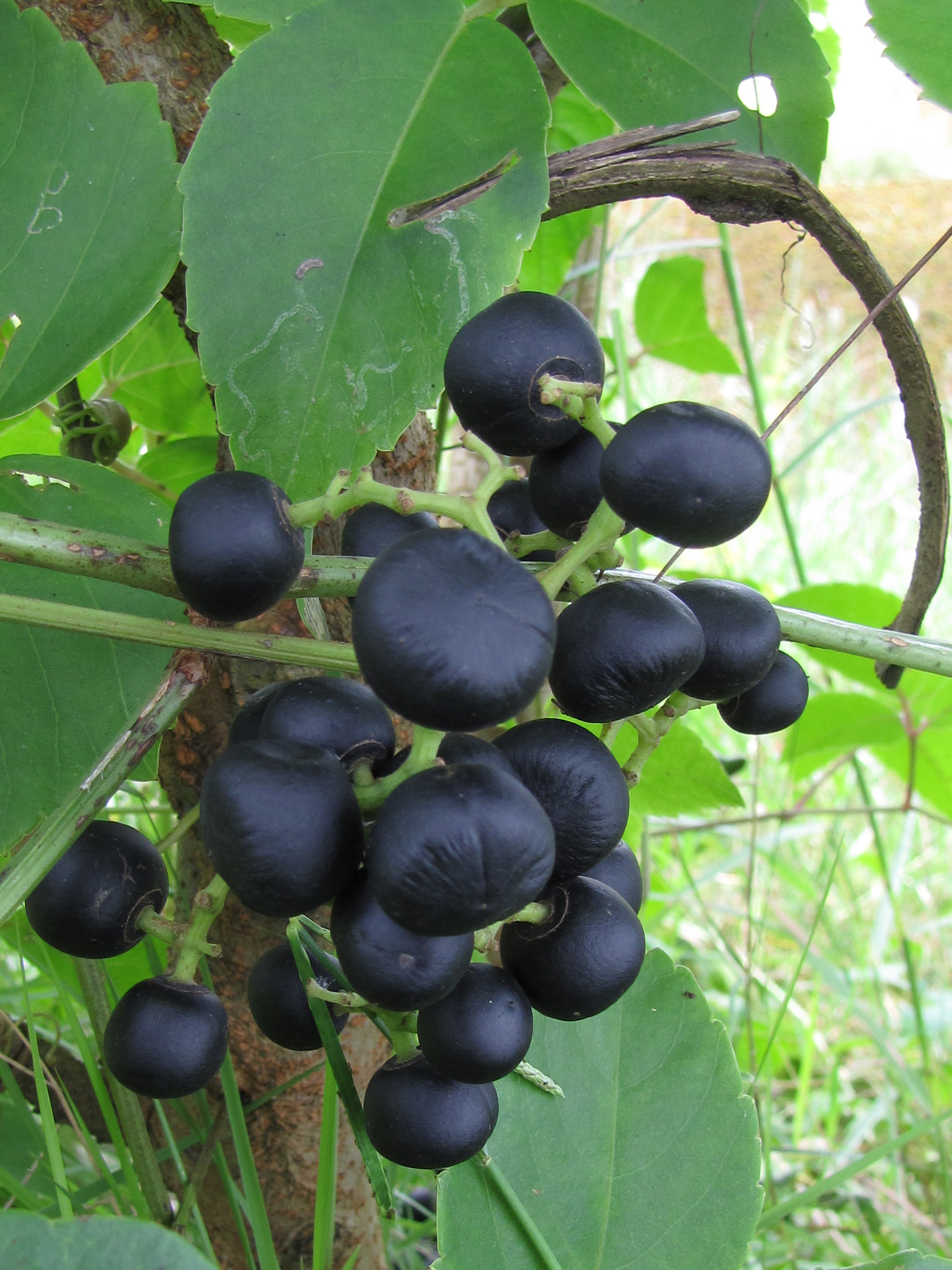
Causonis trifolia (Cayratia trifolia)

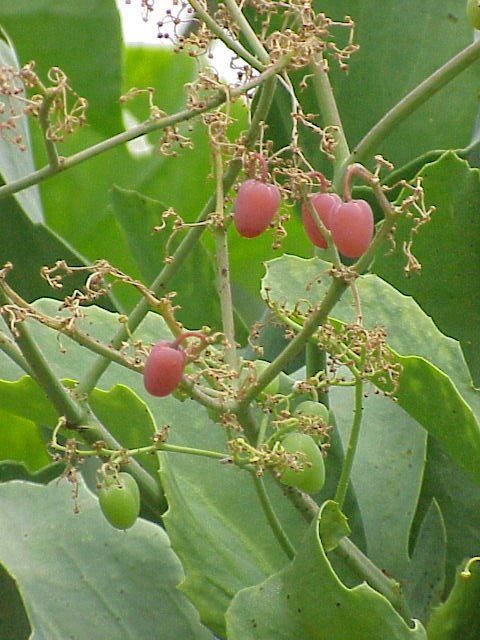
Cyphostemma juttae

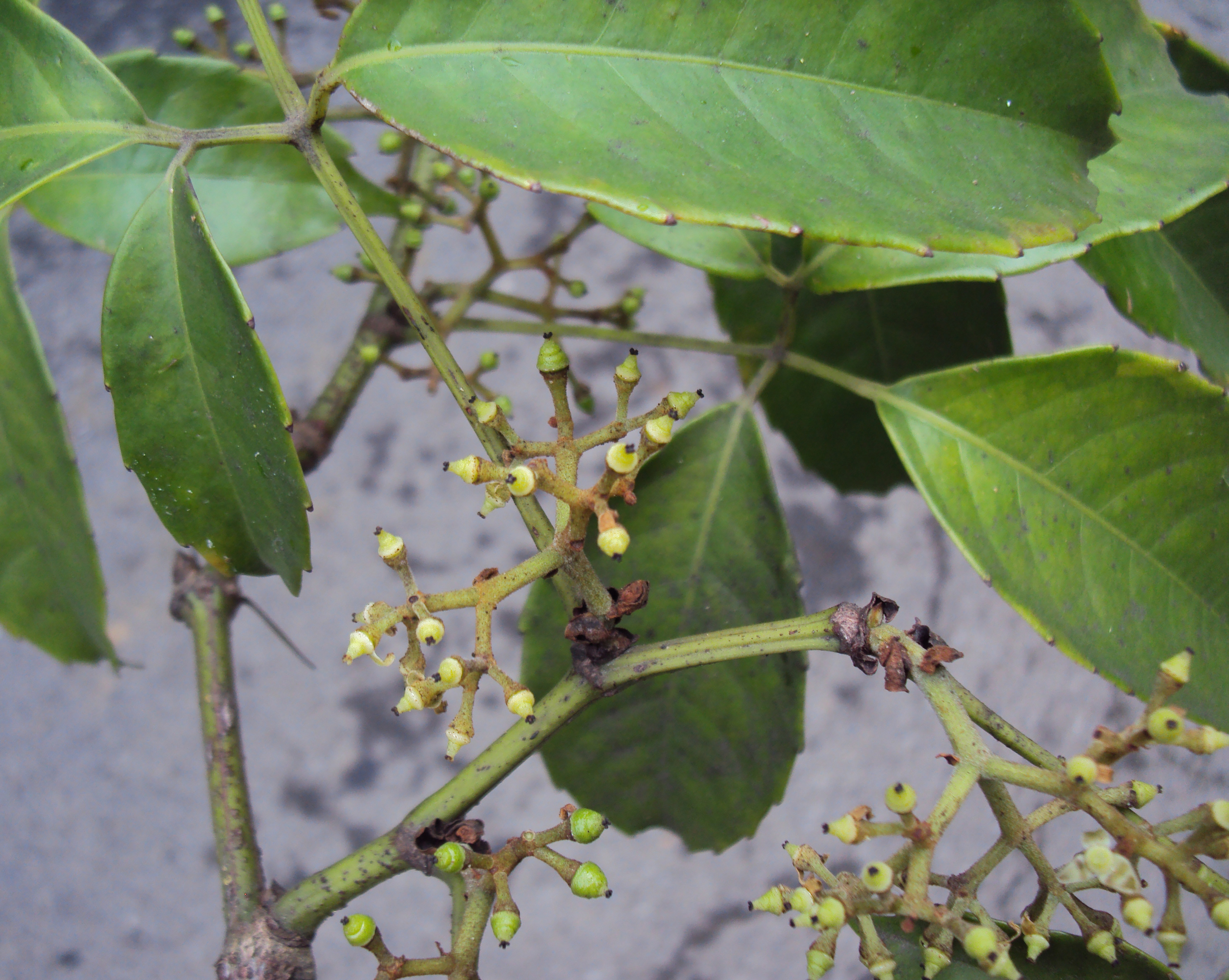
Tetrastigma leucostaphylum

Cisseae

- Apocissus Jackes & Trias-Blasi
- Cissus L. (treebinds) - widespread in tropics & subtropics
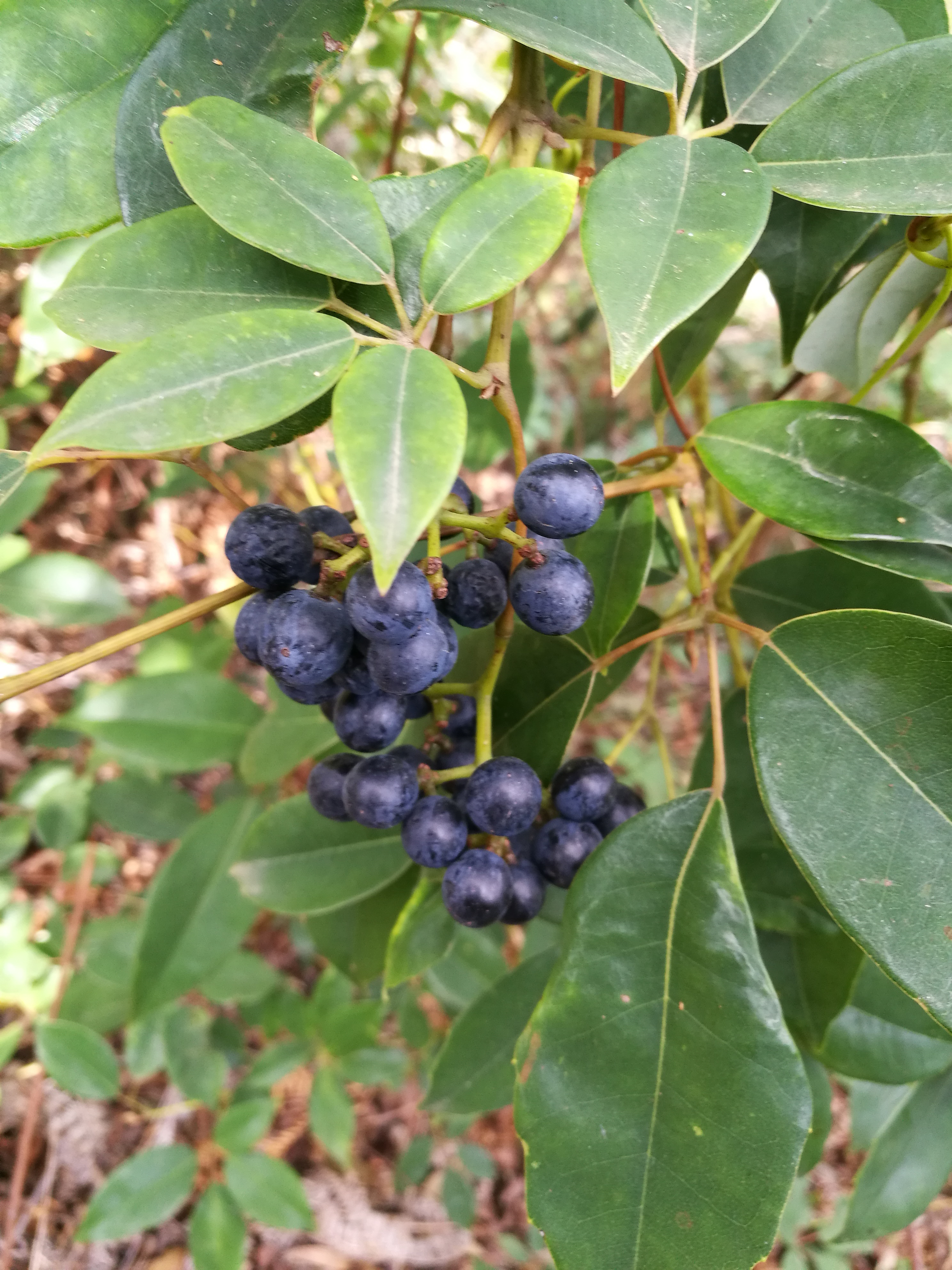
Apocissus hypoglauca (Cissus hypoglauca)

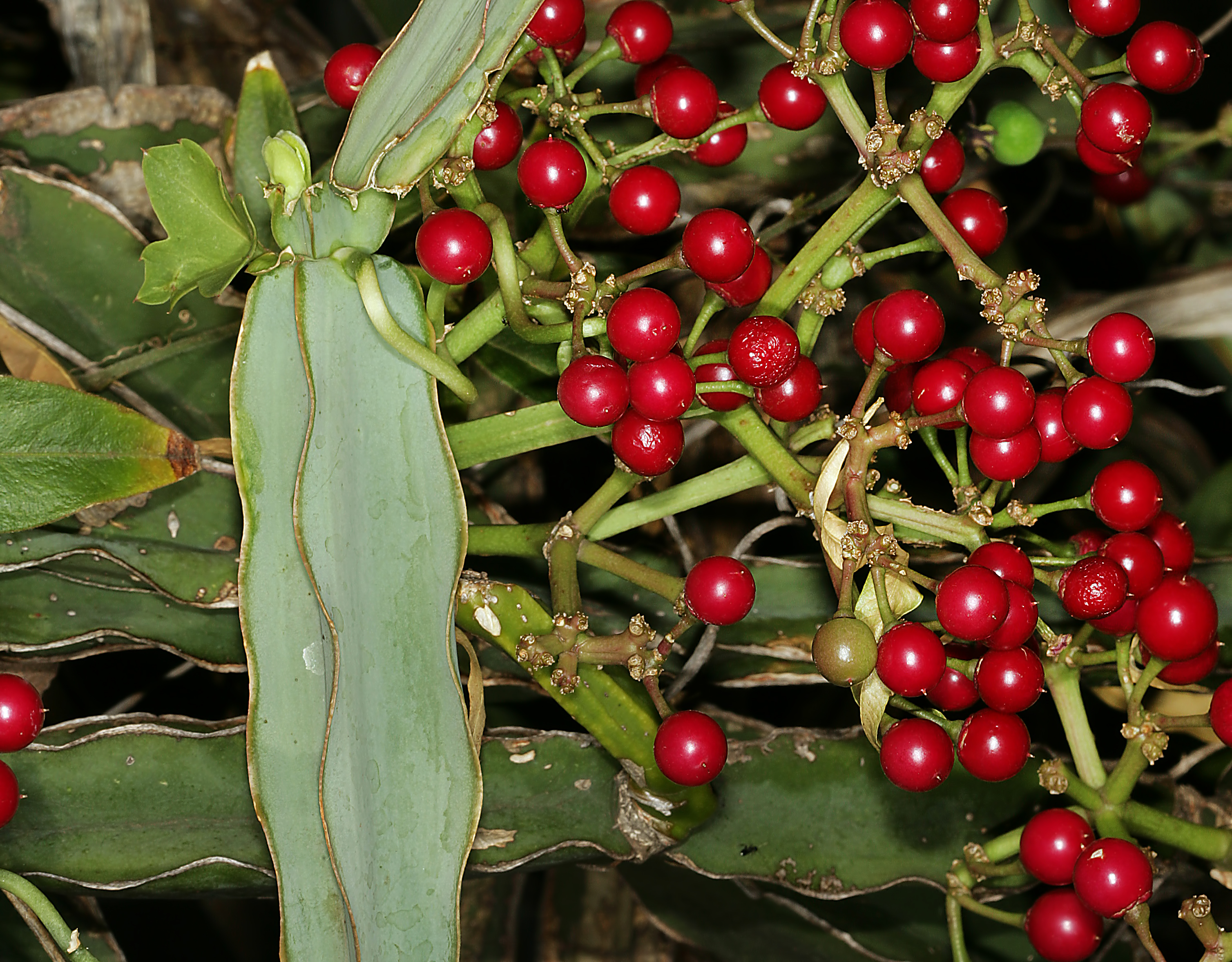
Cissus quadrangularis

Parthenocisseae

- Parthenocissus Planch.
- Yua C.L.Li
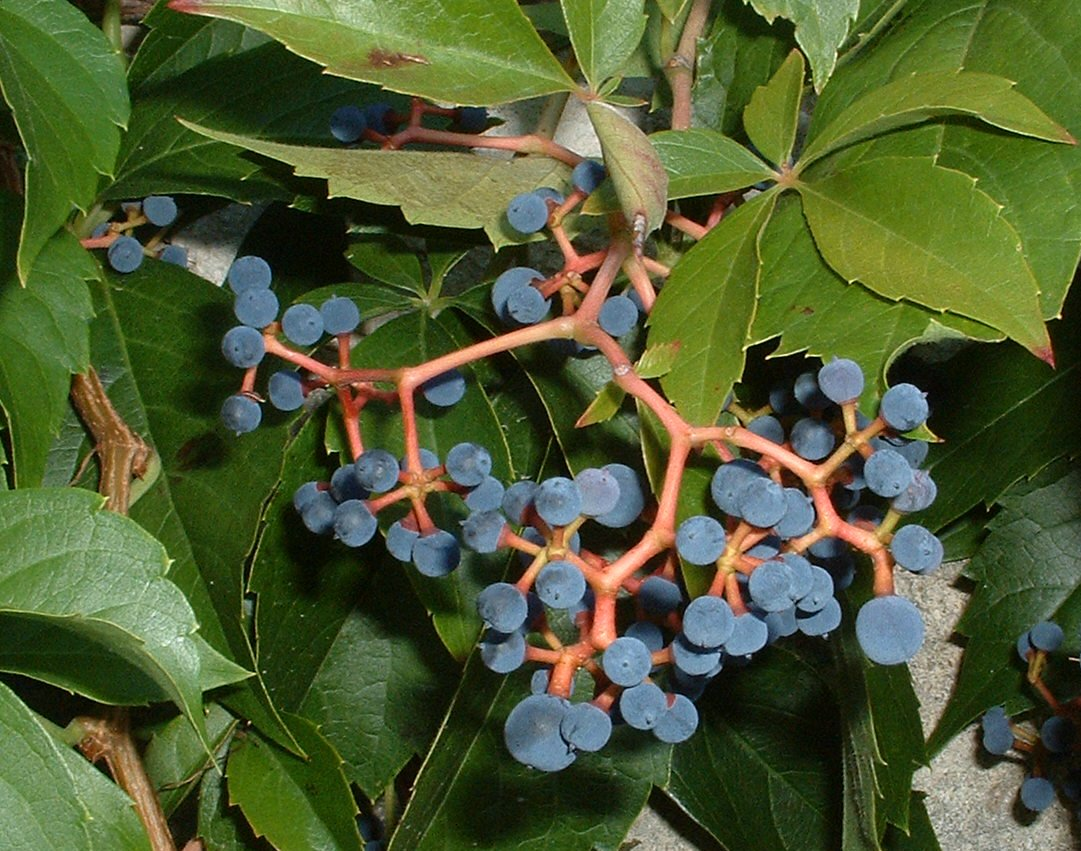
Parthenocissus quinquefolia

Viteae

- Ampelocissus Planch.
- Nothocissus (Miq.) Latiff
- Vitis L. (includes grape vine)
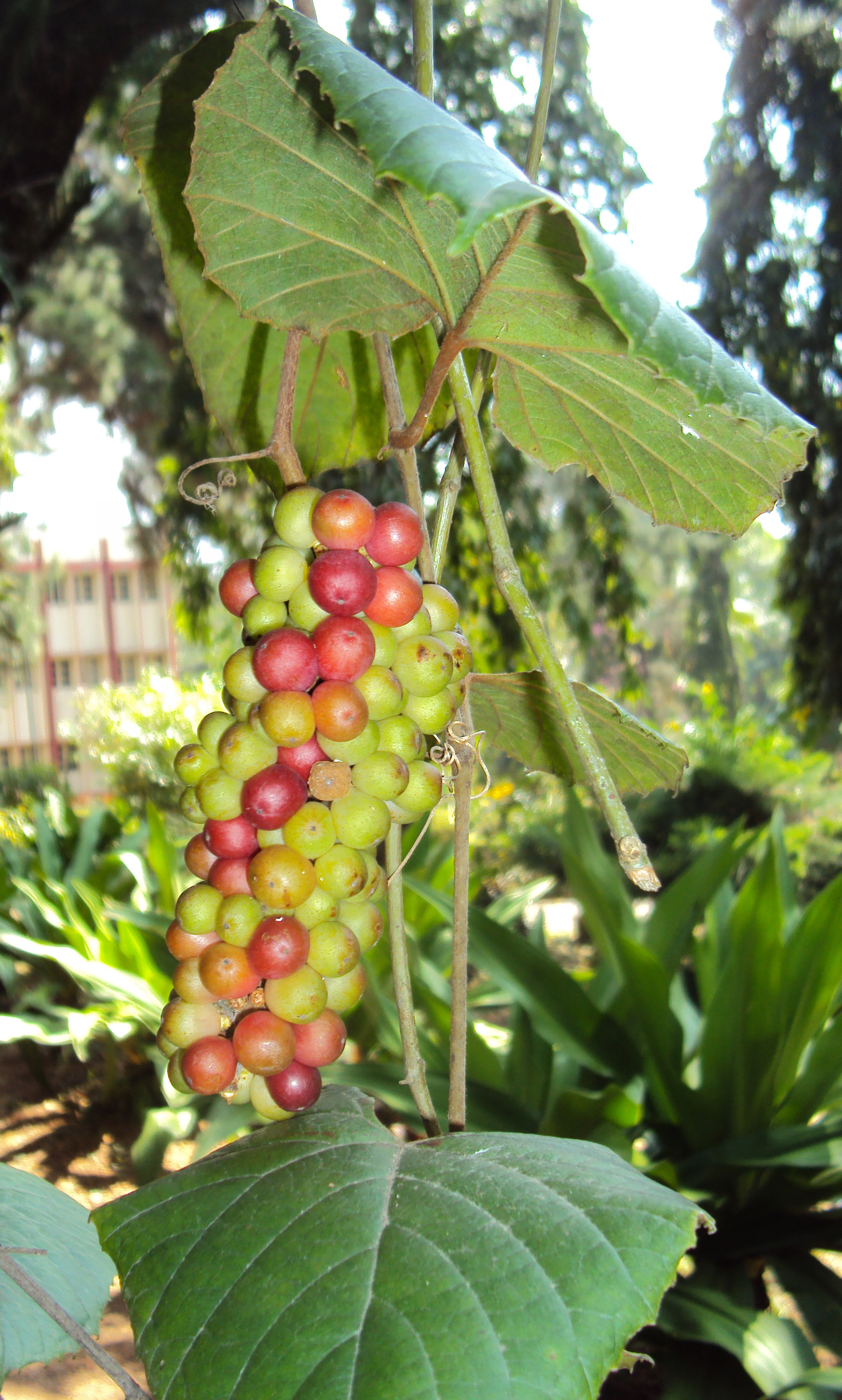
Ampelocissus latifolia

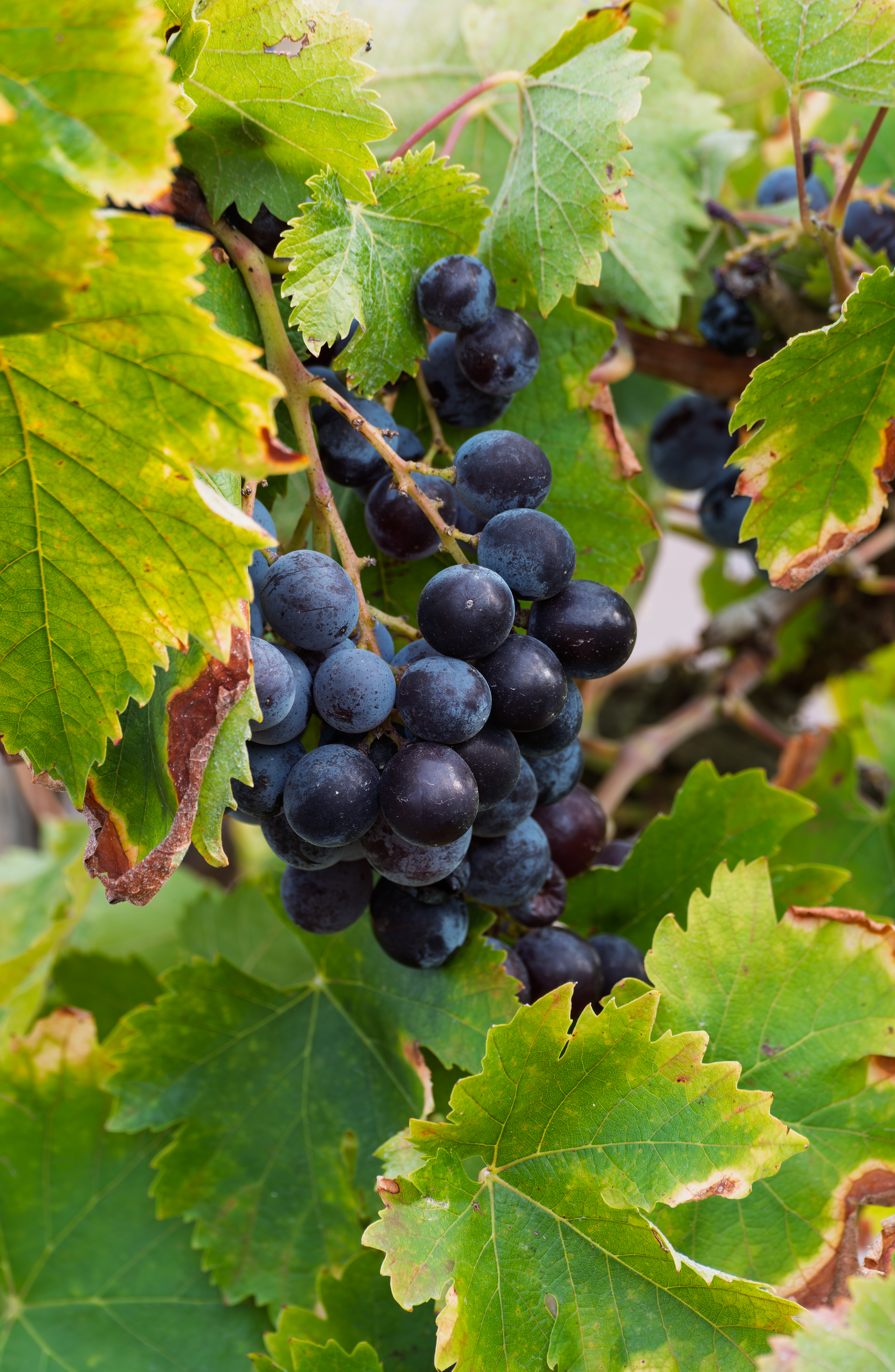
Vitis vinifera

tribe incertae sedis

- Pterisanthes Blume (Indochina, Malesia)

== Genetics ==
Chromosome numbers of Vitaceae vary, and some of the genera have been reclassified based on the differences in chromosome numbers. Most Vitis species, in subgenera Euvitis, have 38 chromosomes (n=19), but the species belong the other subgenera Muscadinia have 40 (n=20). Other genera in the family such as Ampelocissus, Parthenocissus, and Ampelopsis could have 40 chromosomes (n=20) while genus Cissus may have 24 chromosomes (n=12).

== Distribution and habitat ==
Vitaceae is distributed mostly in tropical regions while some of its genera can be found in temperate regions, such as genus Ampelopsis which is restricted to the north temperate area. Genera Nekemias, Parthenocissus, Vitis and Yua also mainly or completely live in temperate areas. The family spreads across pantropical areas in Asia, Africa, Australia, the neotropics and the Pacific Islands. Their habitats include tropical and temperate forests, savannas and limestone mountains.

== Viticulture ==
The economic value of Vitaceae is often represented by viticulture, the practice of cultivating and harvesting the fruit of Vitis, grapes, and food and ingredients derived from grapes, such as wine, juice, other fresh products as well as raisins.

Grapevine (Vitis vinifera) is one of the oldest and most commonly cultivated fruit crops with its domestication begun around 6,000–8,000 years ago in Transcaucasian region, and it has more than 40,000 grapevine cultivar names. The first American grape species being cultivated is Muscadine (Vitis rotundifolia) and can be dated back to mid-18th century.

== Fossil record ==
Vitaceae has a rich fossil record that spreads across Australia, Asia (China, India), Europe as well as North, South and Central America. The fossil evidence found includes wood, pollens, fruits and seeds.

Fossil species Indovitis chitaleyae is believed to be the earliest example of Vitaceae. One study published in 2013 examined the fruits and seeds of I. chitaleyae unearthed from Late Cretaceous Deccan Intertrappean beds of several sites in central India. The seeds investigated, including the ones from immature fruits bearing 4-6 seeds each and isolated mature seeds, are about 66 millions years old, and they feature diagnostic characteristics of order Vitales, such as having "paired ventral infolds and a dorsal chalaza".

I. chitaleyae is grouped into the 5-petaled groups of Vitaceae by the study for its "confinement of the chalazal scar to an elliptical knot on the dorsal side". Several morphological evidences furthermore suggest a closer position to the extant Vitis, although the fossil seed lacks one commonly shared trait in most Vitis species and Ampelocissus of having a cylindrical, terminally truncate basal beak.
