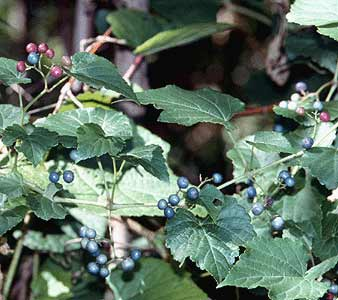
- Ampelopsis glandulosa var. brevipedunculata

Scientific classification
- Kingdom: Plantae
- Clade: Tracheophytes
- Clade: Angiosperms
- Clade: Eudicots
- Clade: Rosids
- Order: Vitales
- Family: Vitaceae
- Subfamily: Vitoideae
- Genus: Ampelopsis; Michx.

Species
- See text.

= Ampelopsis =

Genus of shrubs

Ampelopsis, commonly known as peppervine or porcelainberry, is a genus of climbing shrubs, in the grape family Vitaceae. The name is derived from the Ancient Greek: ἅμπελος (ampelos), which means "vine". The genus was named in 1803. It is disjunctly distributed in eastern Asia and eastern North America extending to Mexico. Ampelopsis is primarily found in mountainous regions in temperate zones with some species in montane forests at mid-altitudes in subtropical to tropical regions. Ampelopsis glandulosa is a popular garden plant and an invasive weed.

== Species ==
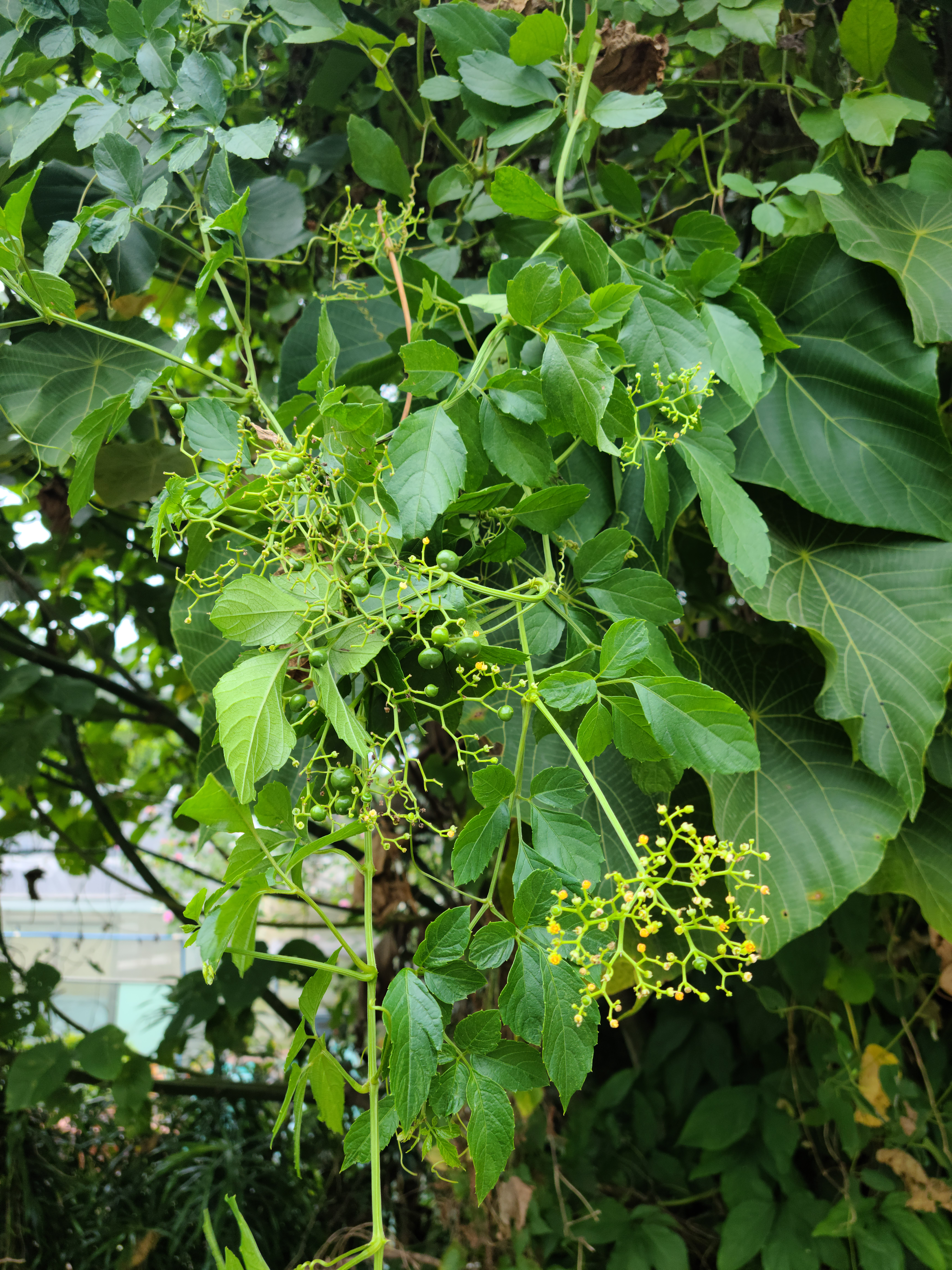
Ampelopsis heterophylla var. vestita

Plants of the World Online currently includes:

1. Ampelopsis aconitifolia Bunge
2. Ampelopsis acutidentata W.T.Wang
3. Ampelopsis bodinieri (H.Lév. & Vaniot) Rehder
4. Ampelopsis chondisensis (Vassilcz. & V.N.Vassil.) Tulyag.
5. Ampelopsis cordata Michx. – False grape, raccoon-grape, heart-leaf peppervine or heart-leaf ampelopsis
6. Ampelopsis delavayana Planch. ex Franch.
7. Ampelopsis denudata Planch.
8. Ampelopsis glandulosa (Wall.) Momiy.
9. Ampelopsis humulifolia Bunge
10. Ampelopsis japonica (Thunb.) Makino – Japanese peppervine
11. Ampelopsis mollifolia W.T.Wang
12. Ampelopsis orientalis (Lam.) Planch.
13. Ampelopsis tadshikistanica Zaprjagaeva
14. Ampelopsis tomentosa Planch. ex Franch.
15. Ampelopsis vitifolia (Boiss.) Planch.
16. Ampelopsis wangii I.M.Turner

=== Moved to genus Nekemias ===
- Ampelopsis arborea (L.) Koehne – Peppervine is now Nekemias arborea
- Ampelopsis cantoniensis (Hook. & Arn.) K.Koch
- Ampelopsis grossedentata (Hand.-Mazz.) W.T.Wang

== Ecology ==
Ampelopsis species are used as food plants by the larvae of some Lepidoptera species, including Bucculatrix quinquenotella and Sphecodina abbottii. Dihydromyricetin, which is an effective ingredient in supplements and other tonics, is extracted from the ampelopsin tree.

== Fossil record ==
Fossil seeds from the early Miocene of Ampelopsis ludwigii and Ampelopsis rotundata, have been found in the Czech part of the Zittau Basin. The fossil species Ampelopsis malvaeformis was rather common in northern Italy in the early and middle Pliocene but seems to disappear at the middle and late Pliocene boundary.
