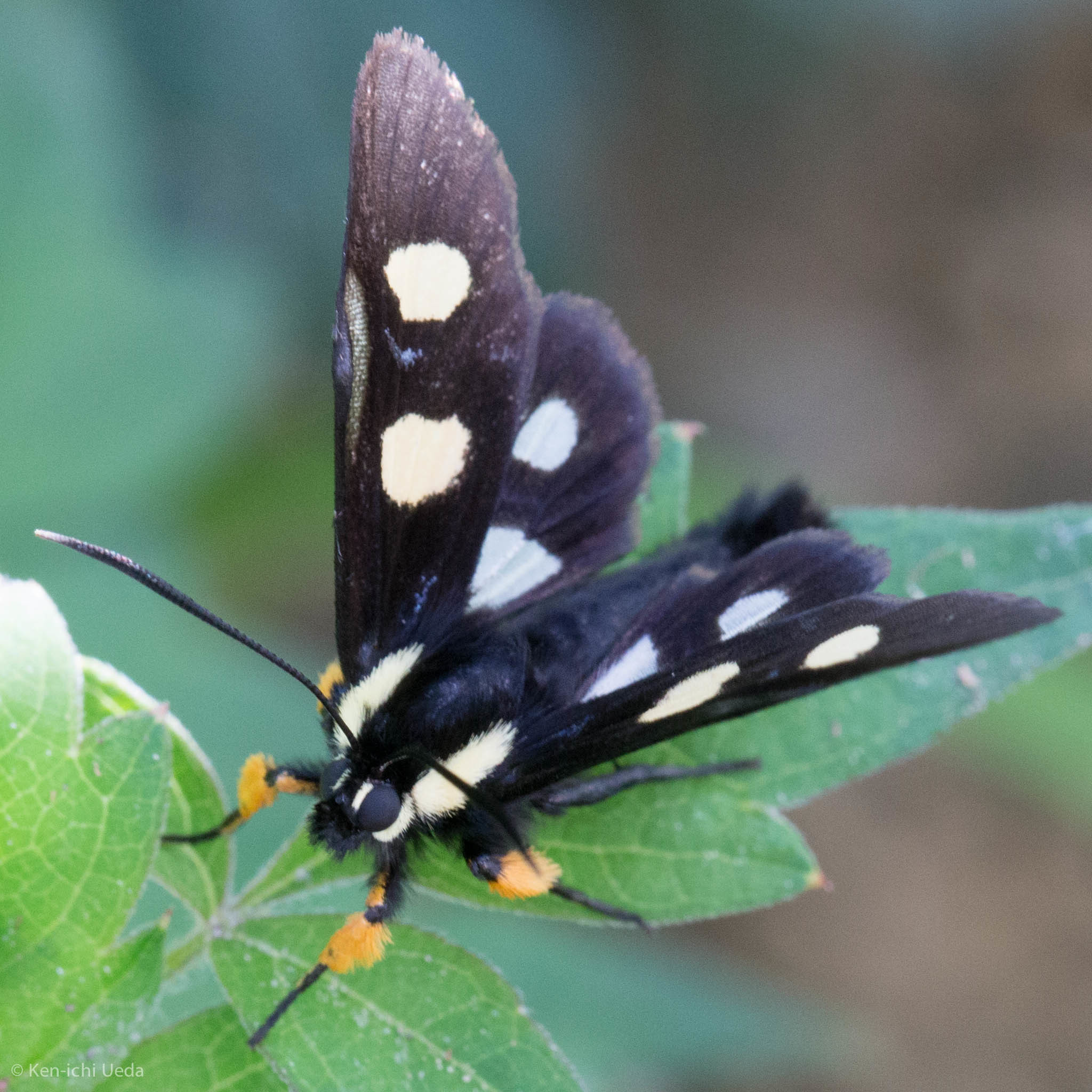
- A. disparata adult male

Scientific classification
- Domain: Eukaryota
- Kingdom: Animalia
- Phylum: Arthropoda
- Class: Insecta
- Order: Lepidoptera
- Superfamily: Noctuoidea
- Family: Noctuidae
- Genus: Androloma
- Species: A. disparata

Binomial name
- Androloma disparata (H. Edwards, 1884)

Synonyms
- Alypia disparata Edwards, 1884; Androloma desperata Kirby, 1892; Alypia gracilenta Graef, 1887

= Androloma disparata =

Disparate forester

Species of moth

Androloma disparata, the disparate forester, is a species of moth in the family Noctuidae (the owlet moths). It is found in Mexico and Texas. The larva feed plants from the Vitaceae family, such as Pepper vine.

The MONA or Hodges number for Androloma disparata is 9322.

== Description ==
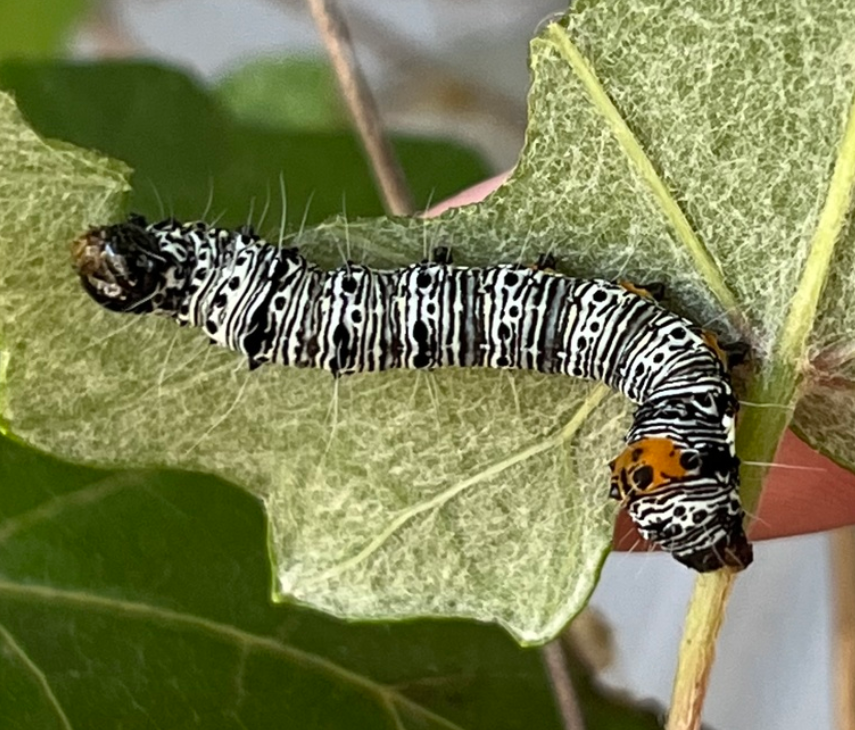
Larva feeding on Vitis mustangensis

The species is sexually dimorphic. Males have raised bump on their forewings with a white streak underneath. Their bodies are overall black with creamy shoulder pads and two white spots on each wing.
