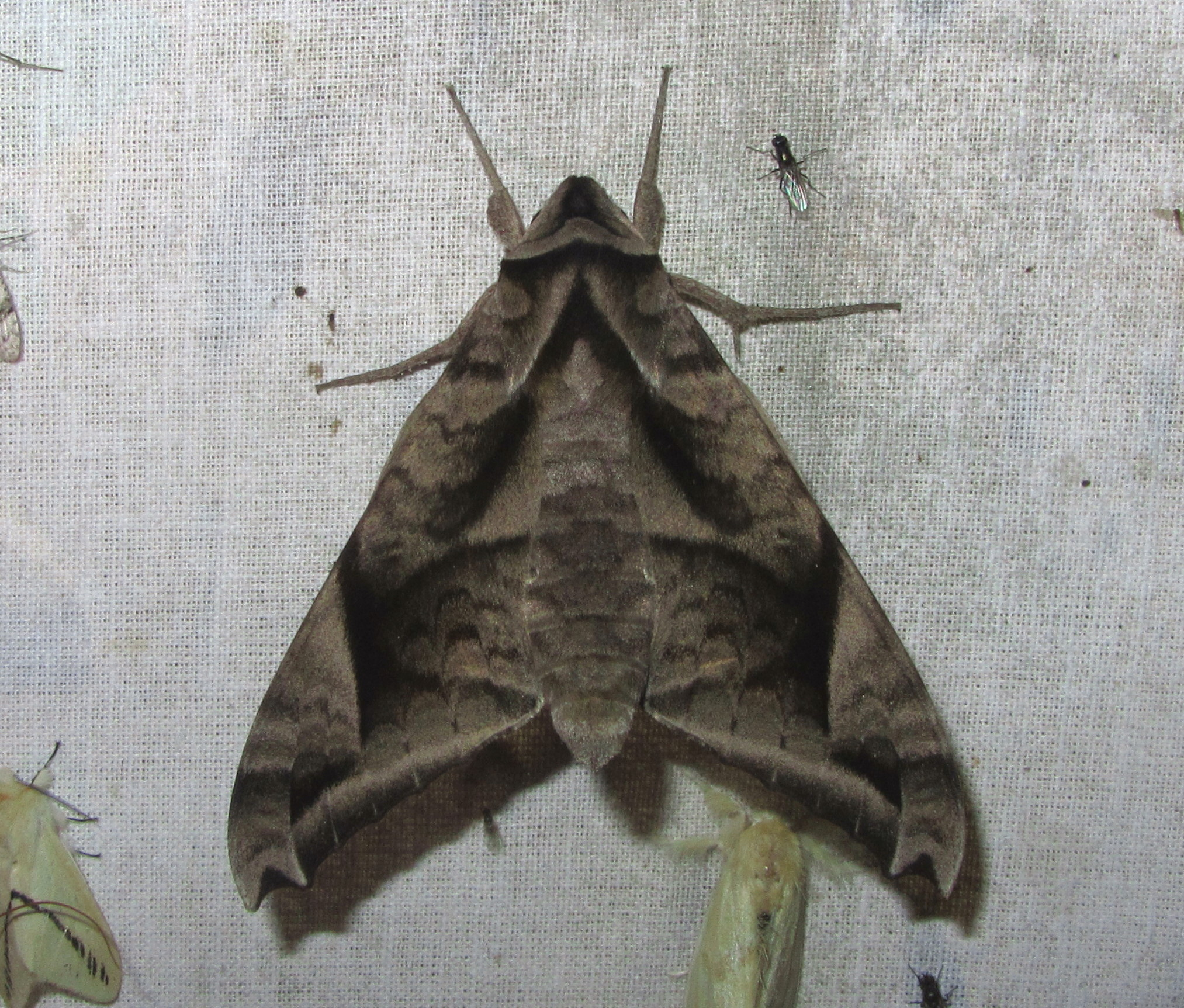
- Acosmeryx naga naga

Scientific classification
- Domain: Eukaryota
- Kingdom: Animalia
- Phylum: Arthropoda
- Class: Insecta
- Order: Lepidoptera
- Family: Sphingidae
- Genus: Acosmeryx
- Species: A. naga

Binomial name
- Acosmeryx naga (Moore, [1858])

Synonyms
- Philampelus naga Moore, [1858]; Acosmeryx metanaga Butler, 1879

= Acosmeryx naga =

Species of moth

Acosmeryx naga is a moth of the family Sphingidae. It was described by Frederic Moore in 1858, and is known from Japan, Tajikistan, Afghanistan, China and South-east Asia.

== Description ==
The wingspan is 86–112 mm.

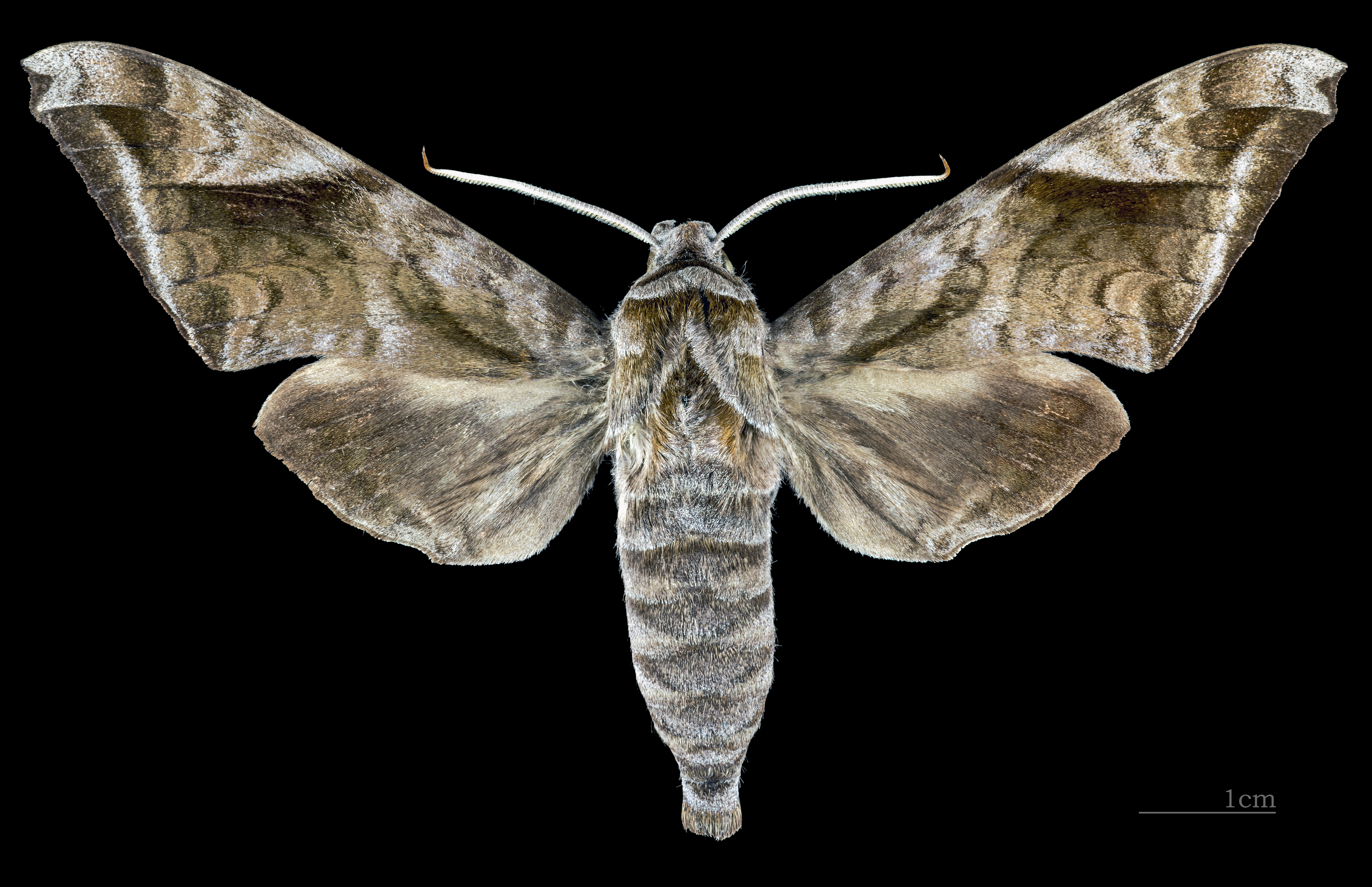
Male, dorsal - MHNT

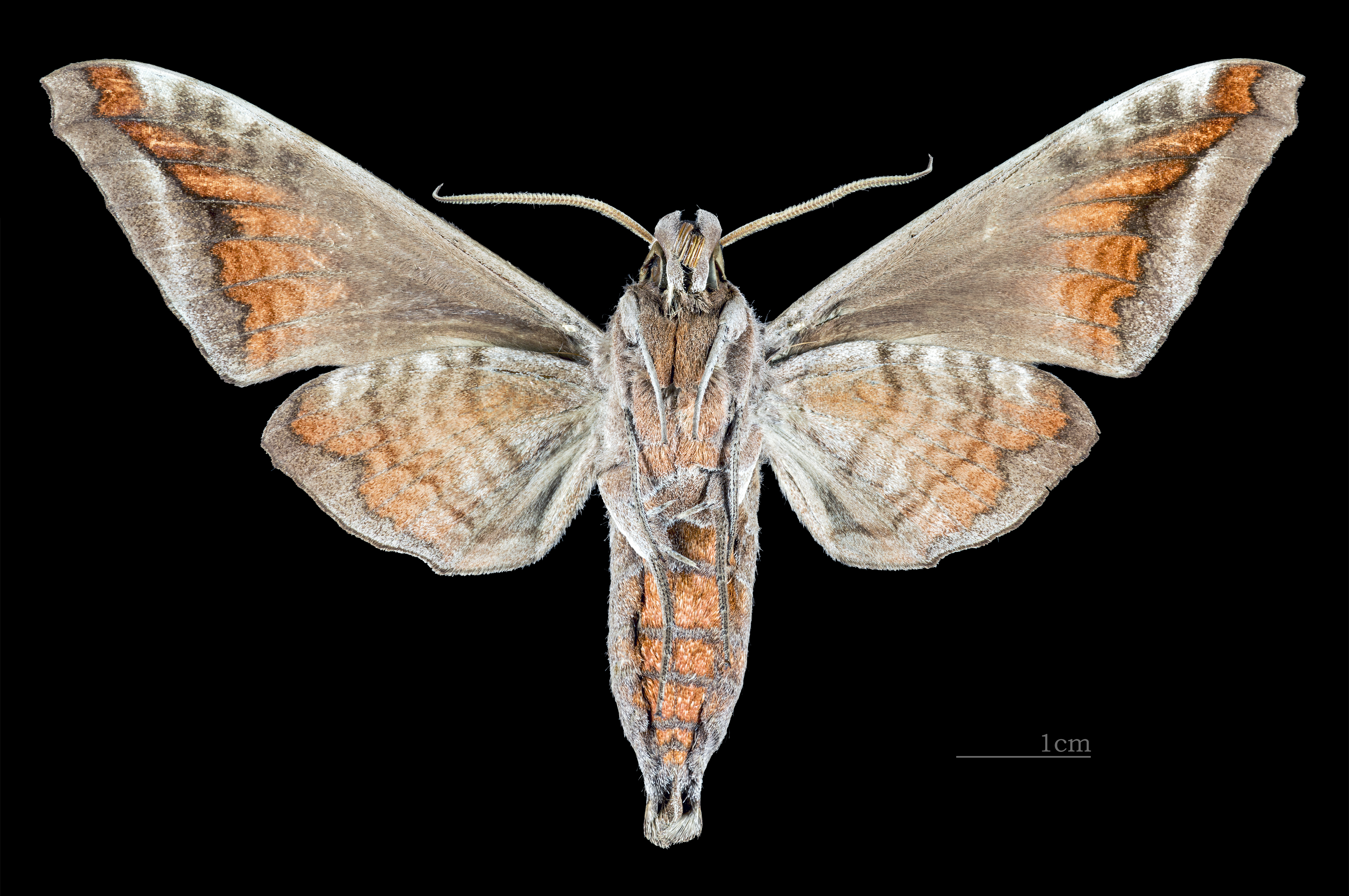
Male, underside ventral

== Distribution ==
In northern China, there is one generation per year, with adults on wing from April to June. In Korea, adults are on wing from early May to mid-August.

== Biology ==
The larva of the species have been found on plants in the genera Vitis, Ampelopsis, Actinidia, and Saurauia.

== Subspecies ==
- Acosmeryx naga naga (Himalayan foothills of Pakistan, India, Nepal and China, Peninsular Malaysia, Thailand, northern Vietnam, eastern and southern China, Taiwan, Korea and Japan)
- Acosmeryx naga hissarica Shchetkin, 1956 (southern Tajikistan and Afghanistan)
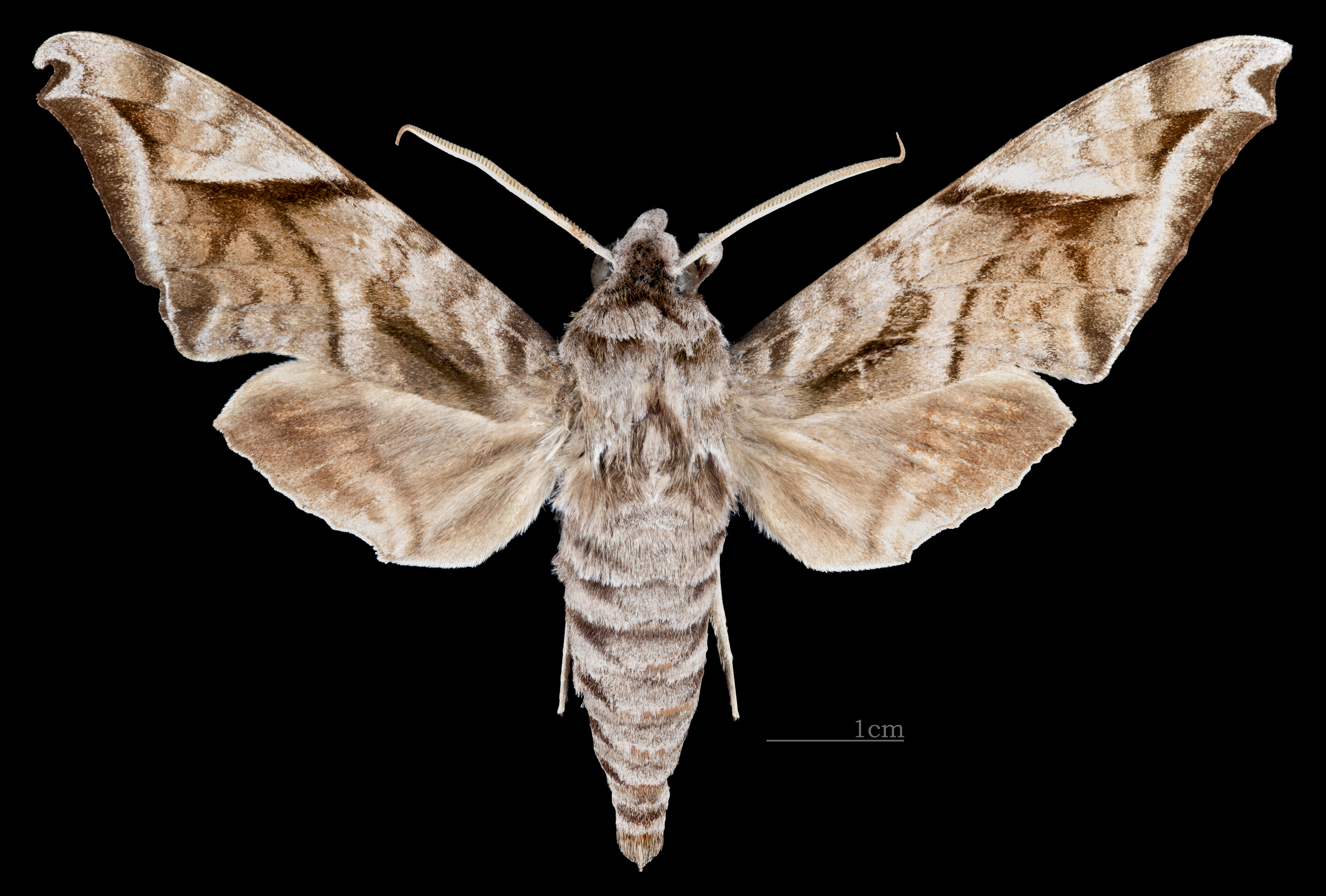
Acosmeryx naga hissarica male, dorsal

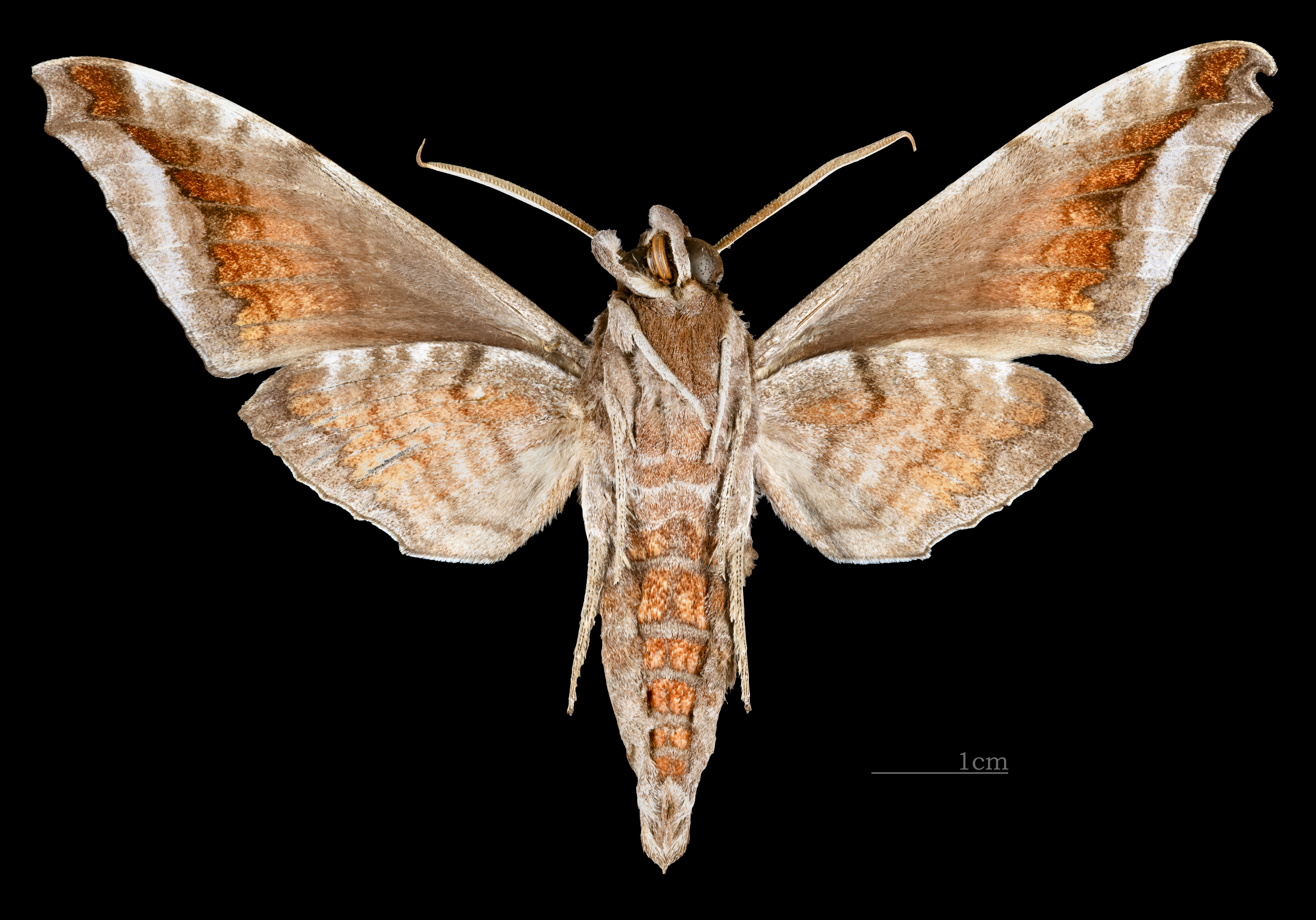
Acosmeryx naga hissarica male, ventral

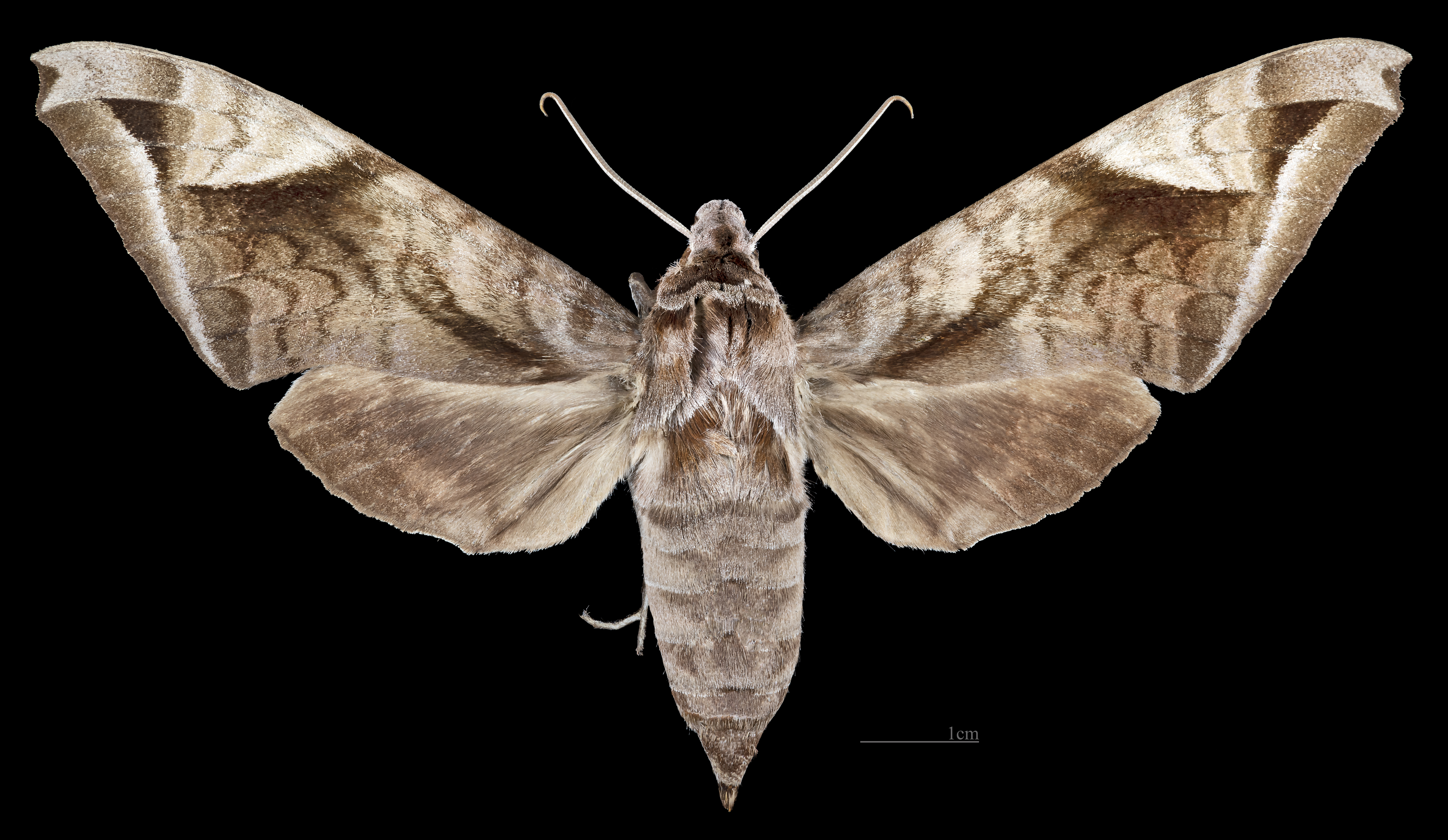
Acosmeryx naga hissarica female, dorsal

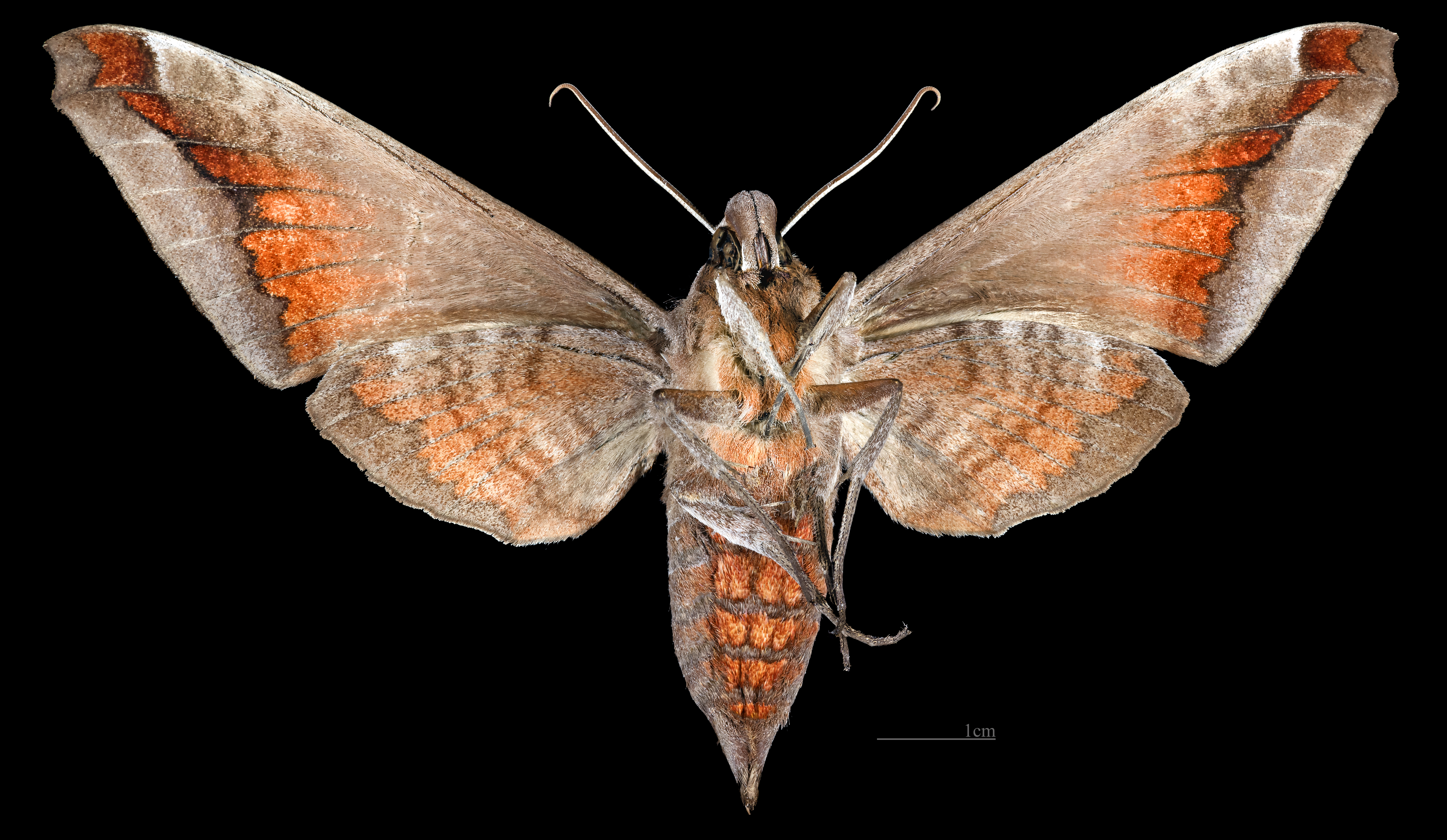
Acosmeryx naga hissarica female ventral
