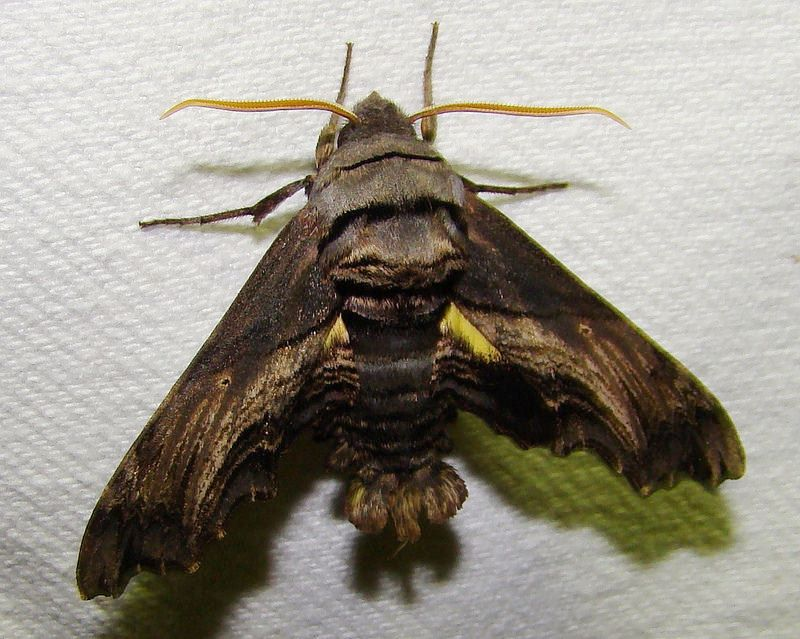

Conservation status
- Secure (NatureServe)

Scientific classification
- Domain: Eukaryota
- Kingdom: Animalia
- Phylum: Arthropoda
- Class: Insecta
- Order: Lepidoptera
- Family: Sphingidae
- Genus: Sphecodina
- Species: S. abbottii

Binomial name
- Sphecodina abbottii (Swainson, 1821)

Synonyms
- Thyreus abbottii Swainson, 1821

= Sphecodina abbottii =

Abbott's sphinx

Species of moth

Sphecodina abbottii, or Abbott's sphinx, is a moth of the family Sphingidae. The species was first described by William Swainson in 1821.

== Distribution ==
It lives in central and eastern North America, but is not known to be present in most of Florida.

== Biology ==
Adults fly in May and June in the north, but have several generations in the south. Larvae feed on grapes (Vitis), Parthenocissus quinquefolia and Ampelopsis.

== Description ==
The underwings have a strong yellow band and in flight, the moth buzzes, appearing like a bee. The forewings are violet grey when fresh and have a "barklike pattern of swirling black lines" according to David Beadle and Seabrooke Leckie. At rest, they raise their abdomens and are well camouflaged on tree bark, looking like a broken branch.

Early instars are a pale greenish white, with at first a horn, but later a brown knob near the hind end. Final instars (75 mm in length) come in two patterns: one has brown bands such that there are ten large pale green spots on the back and an eyespot on the rear. This form may mimic grapes. Others are completely brown, with a wood-grain patterning, and with the rear eyespot. In the final instar the knob looks a lot like a vertebrate eye, down to the white reflection spot. If it is pinched or poked, the larva squeaks and bites at the attacker.

== Gallery ==
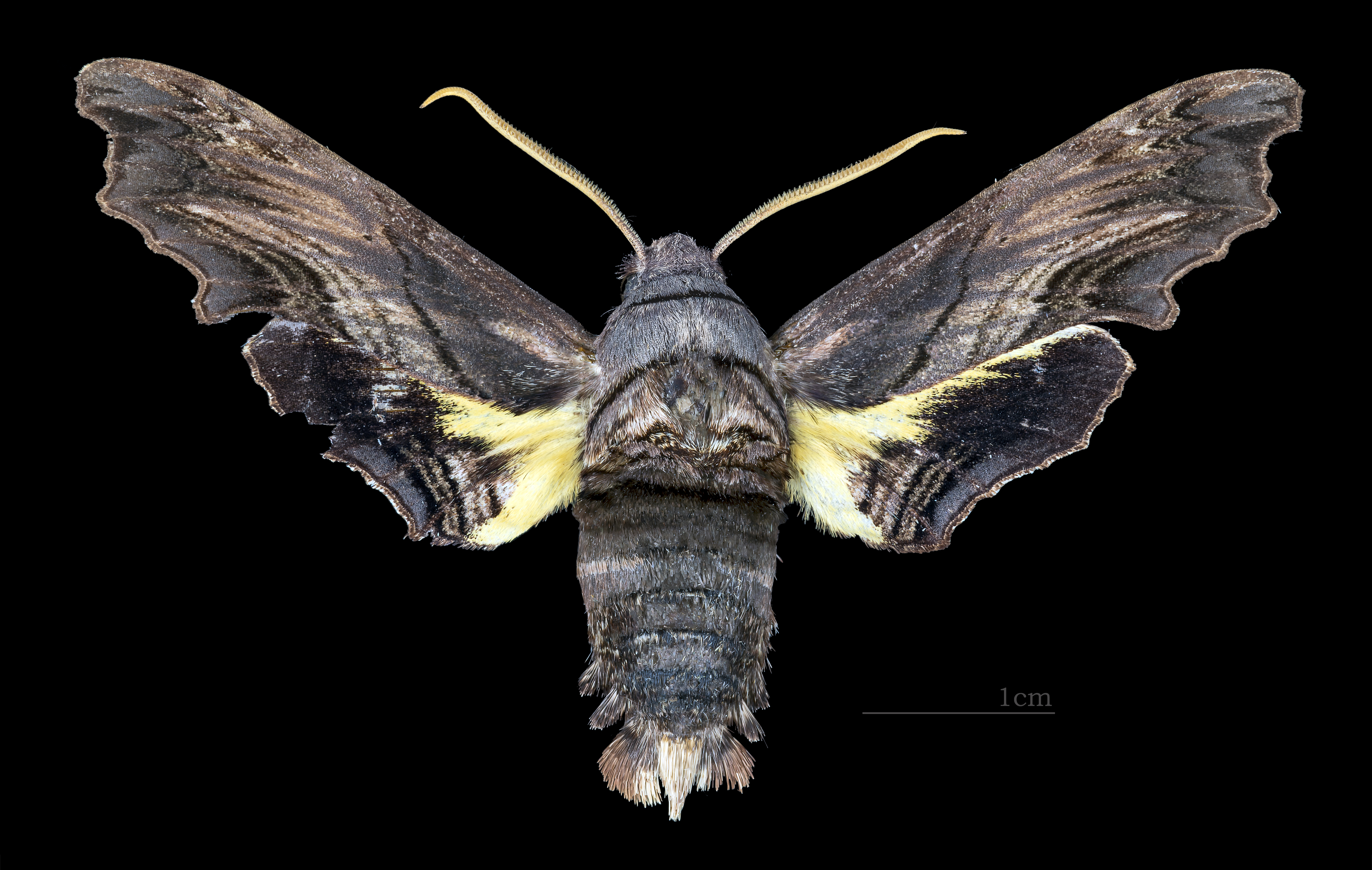
Male

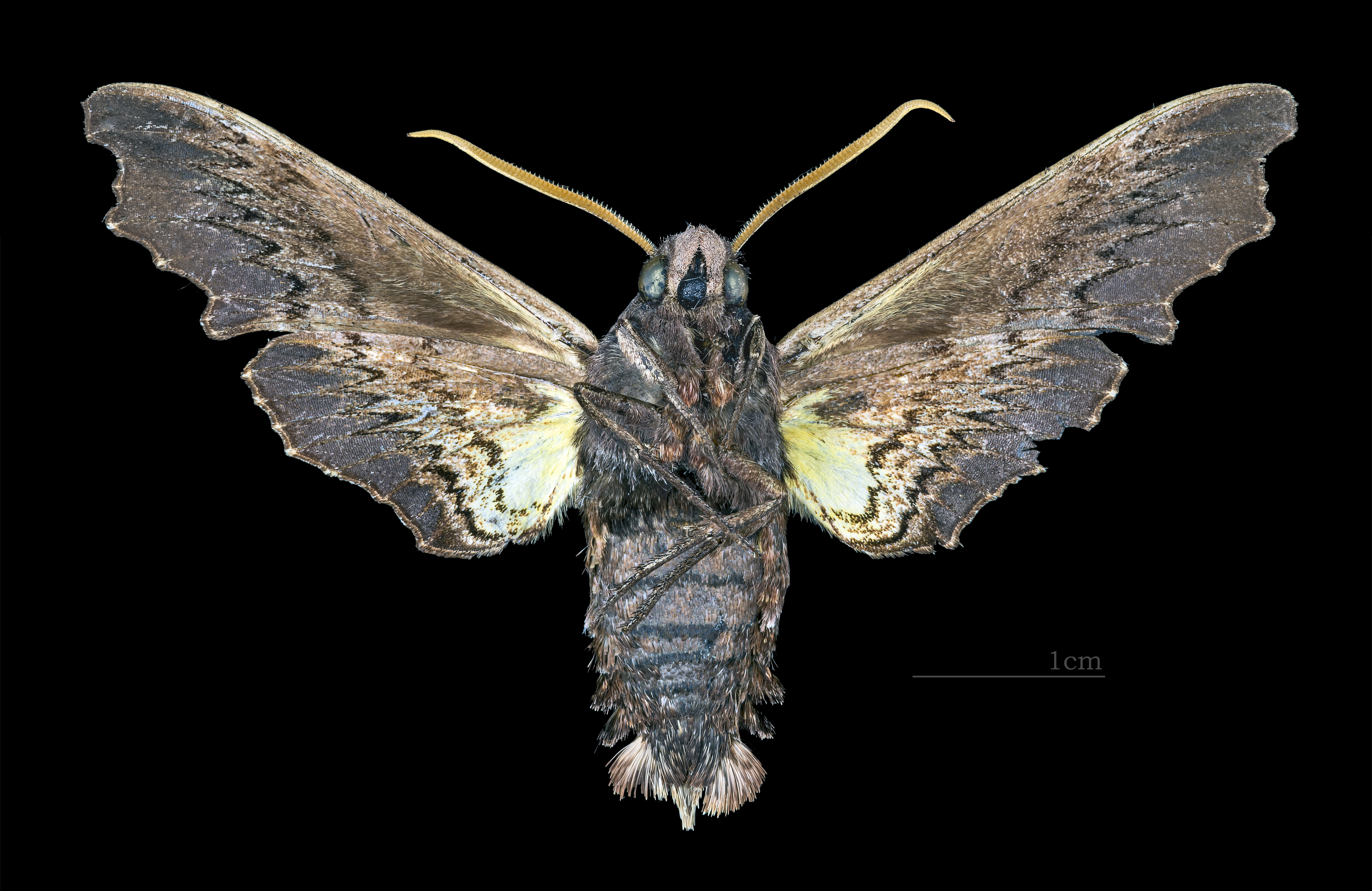
Male underside

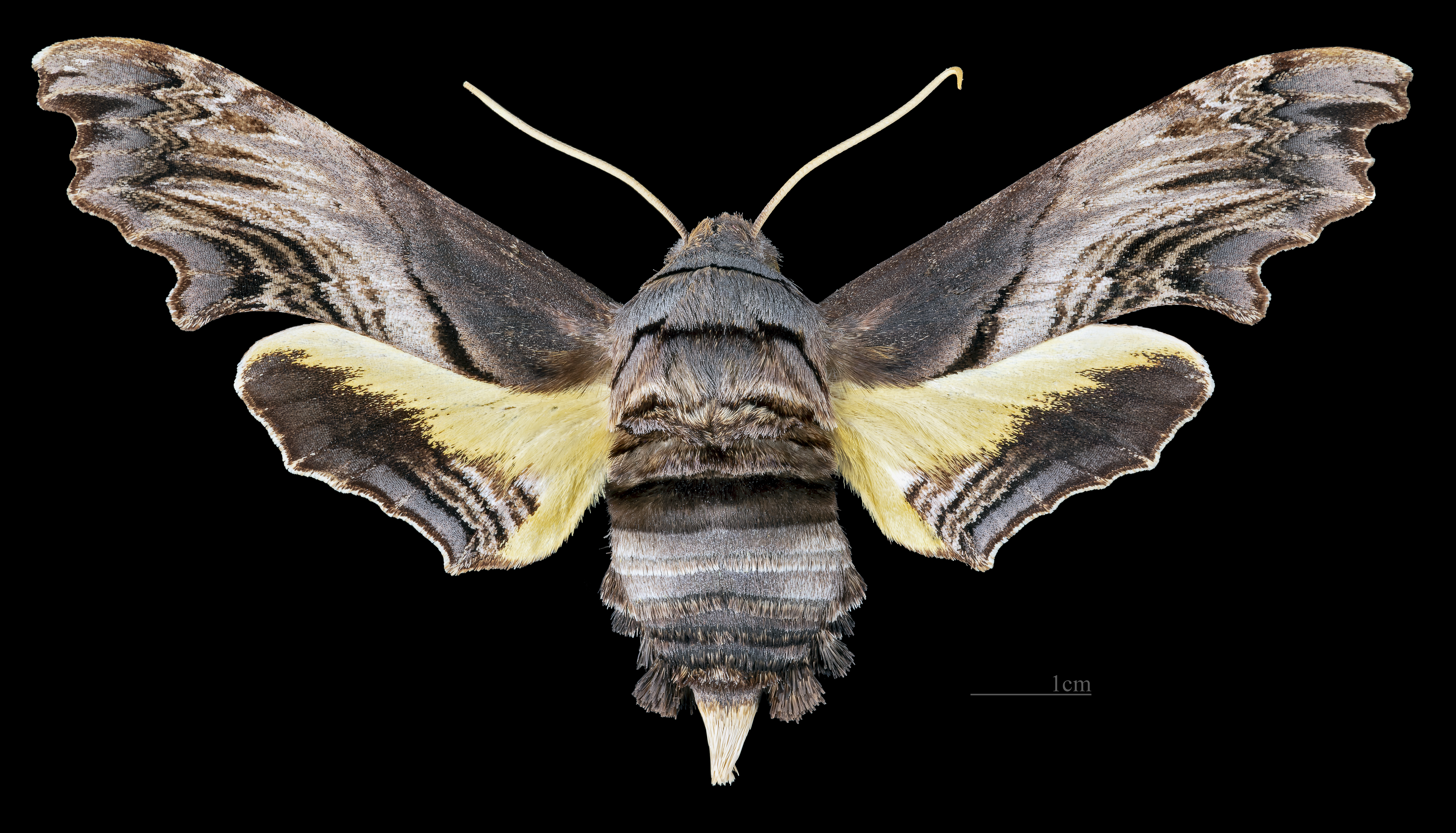
Female

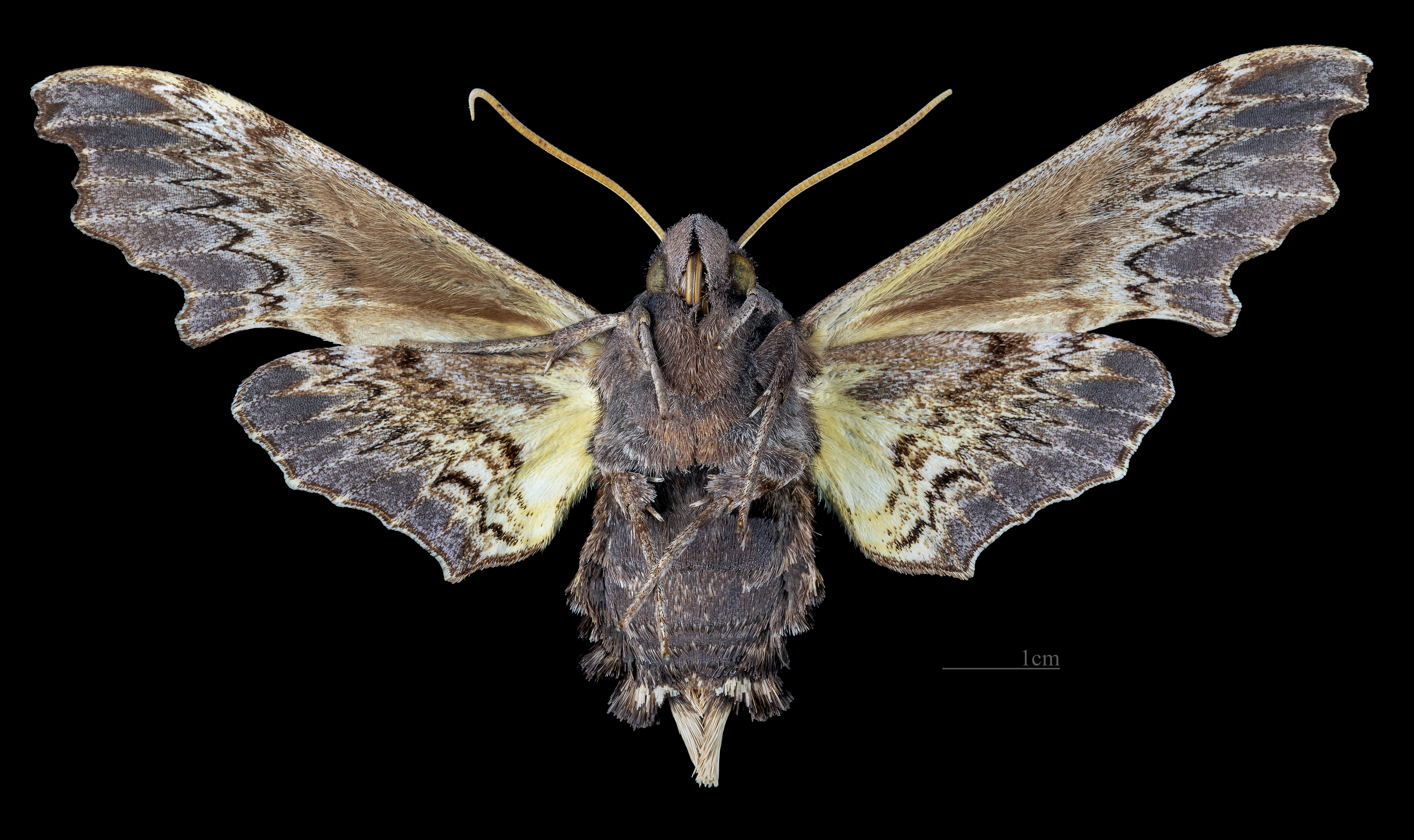
Female underside

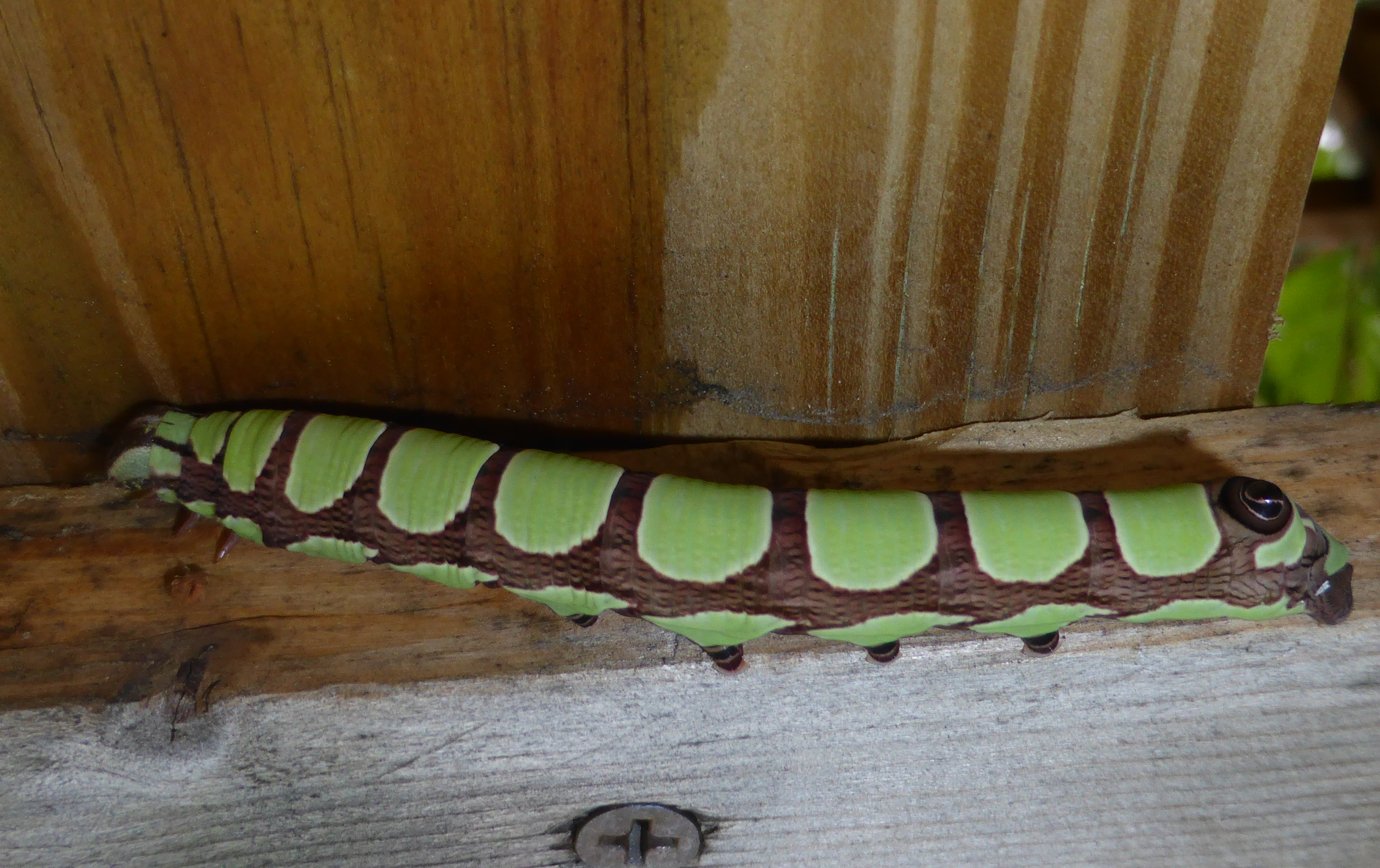
Green form final instar larva

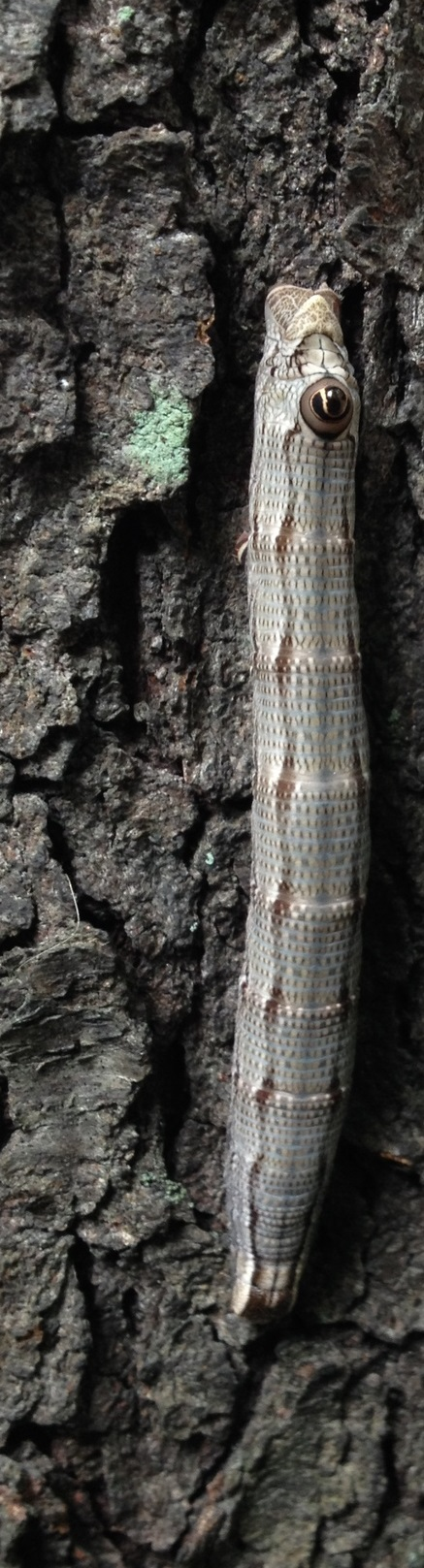
Brown form final instar larva
