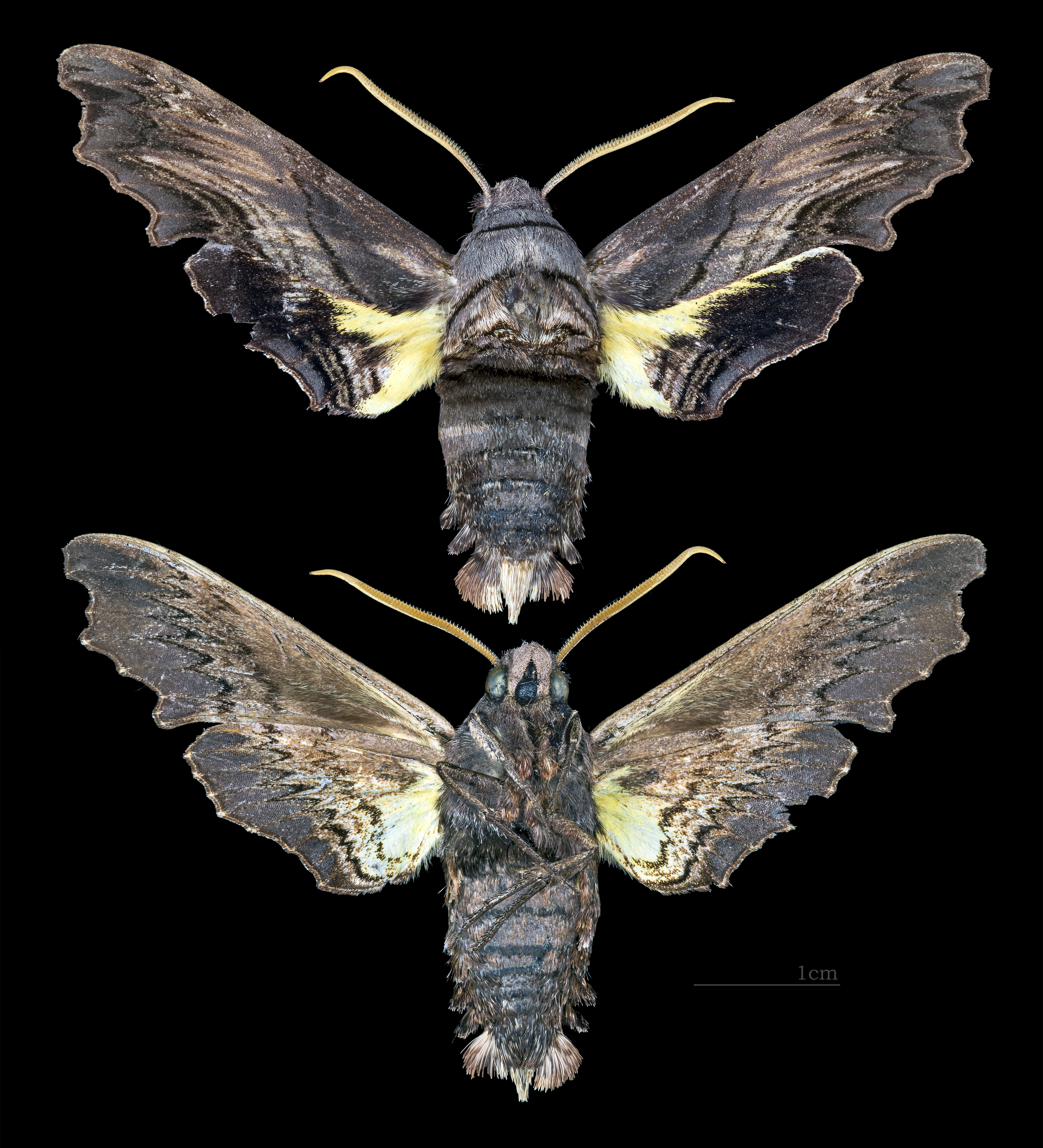
- Sphecodina abbottii

Scientific classification
- Domain: Eukaryota
- Kingdom: Animalia
- Phylum: Arthropoda
- Class: Insecta
- Order: Lepidoptera
- Family: Sphingidae
- Subfamily: Macroglossinae
- Tribe: Macroglossini
- Genus: Sphecodina; Blanchard, 1840

Synonyms
- Brachynota Boisduval, 1870; Maredus Kirby, 1880; Thyreus Swainson, 1821

= Sphecodina =

Genus of moths

Sphecodina is a genus of moths in the family Sphingidae first described by Émile Blanchard in 1840.

== Species ==
- Sphecodina abbottii (Swainson, 1821)
- Sphecodina caudata (Bremer & Grey, 1853)
