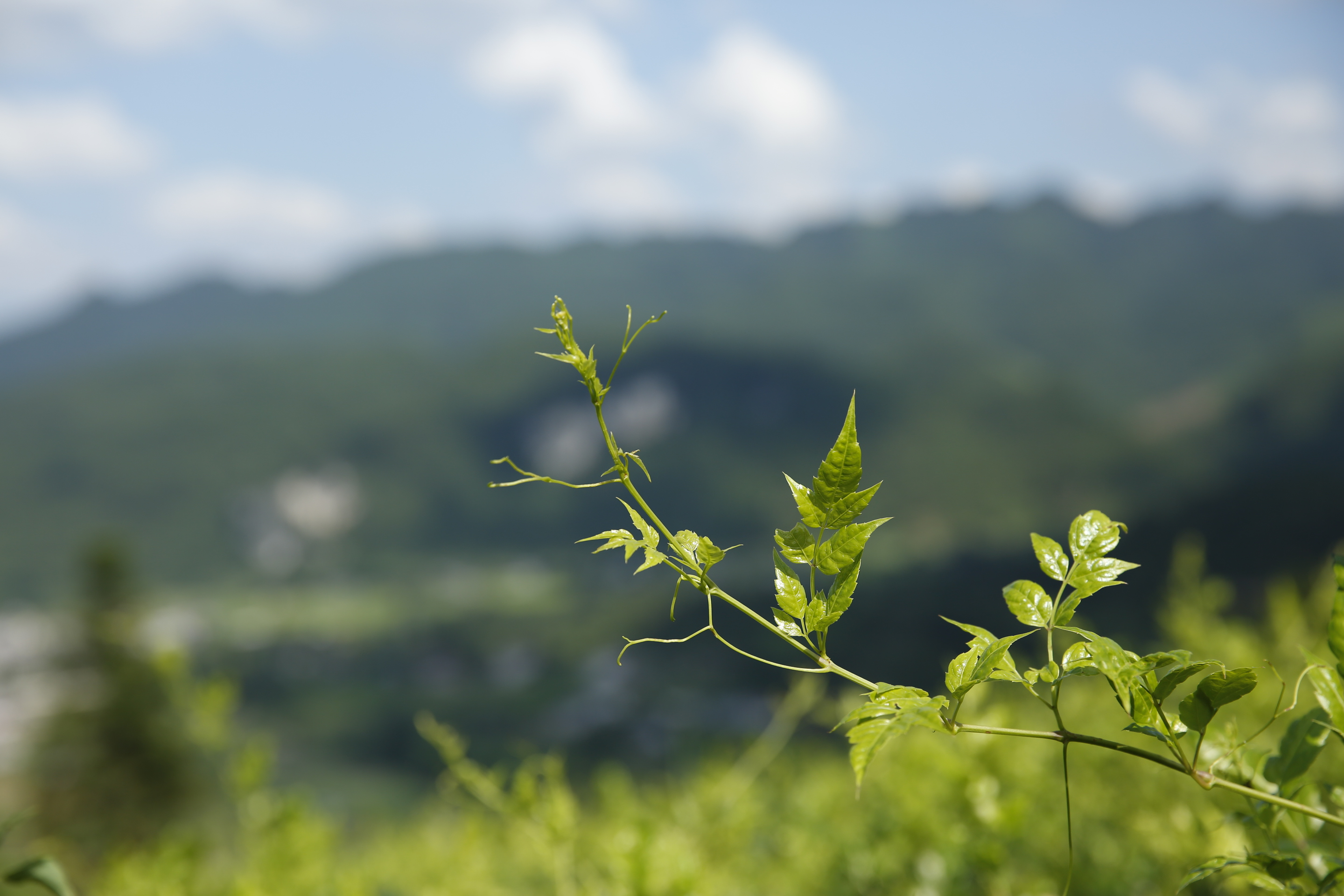

Scientific classification
- Kingdom: Plantae
- Clade: Tracheophytes
- Clade: Angiosperms
- Clade: Eudicots
- Clade: Rosids
- Order: Vitales
- Family: Vitaceae
- Subfamily: Vitoideae
- Genus: Nekemias
- Species: N. grossedentata

Binomial name
- Nekemias grossedentata (Hand.-Mazz.) J.Wen & Z.L.Nie

Synonyms
- Ampelopsis grossedentata (Hand.-Mazz.) W.T.Wang

= Nekemias grossedentata =

Species of vine

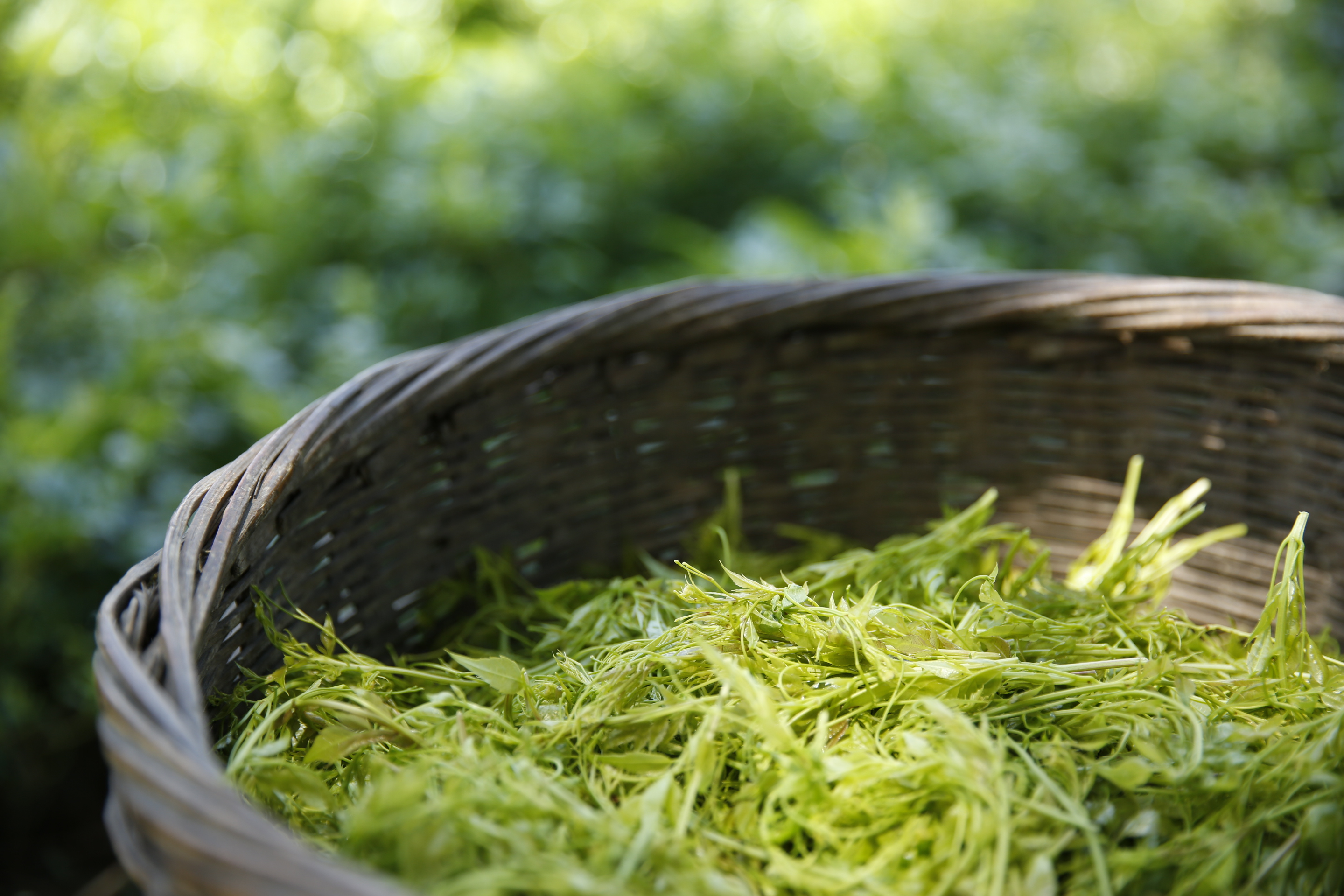
Fresh moyeam leaves

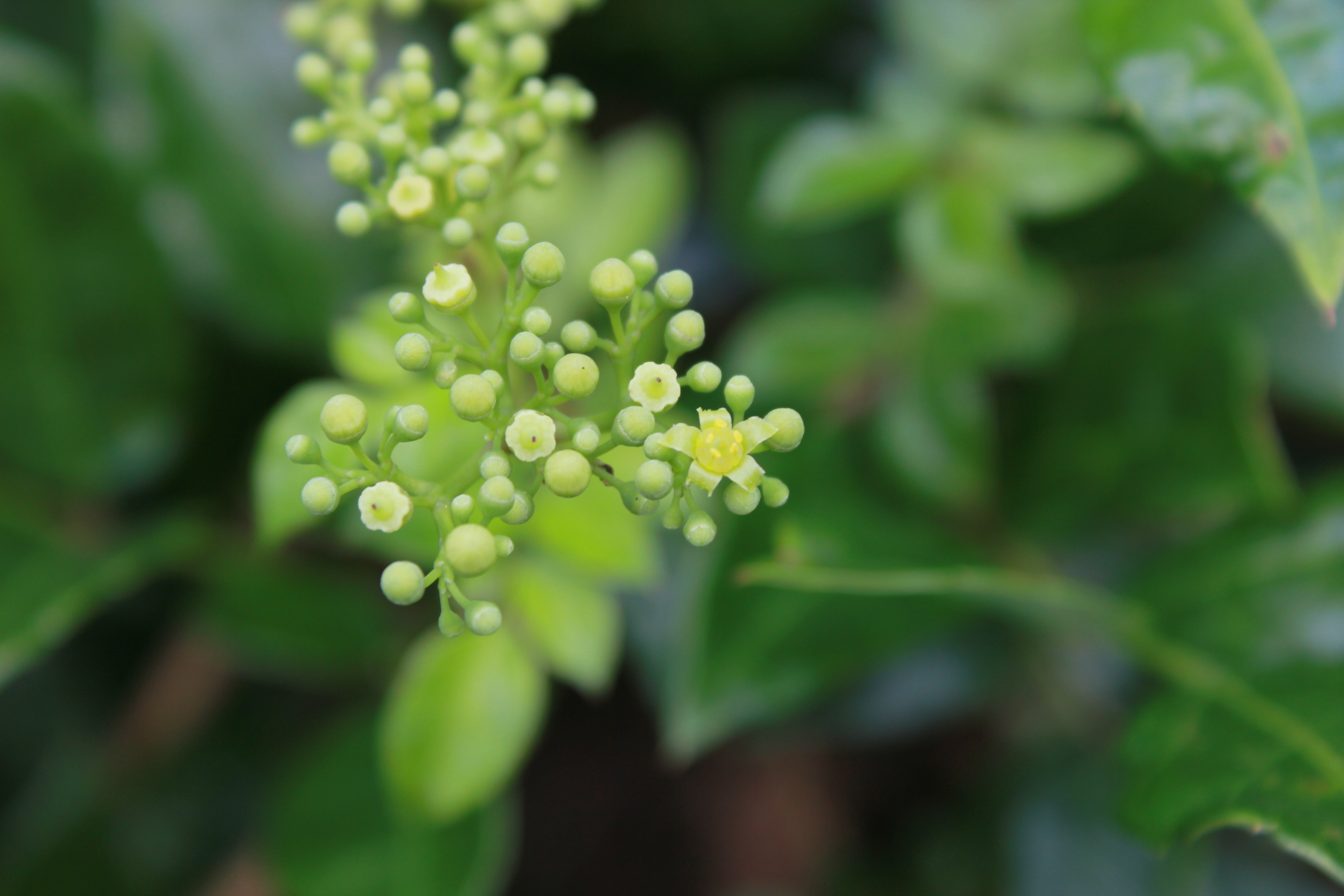
Fresh moyeam flower

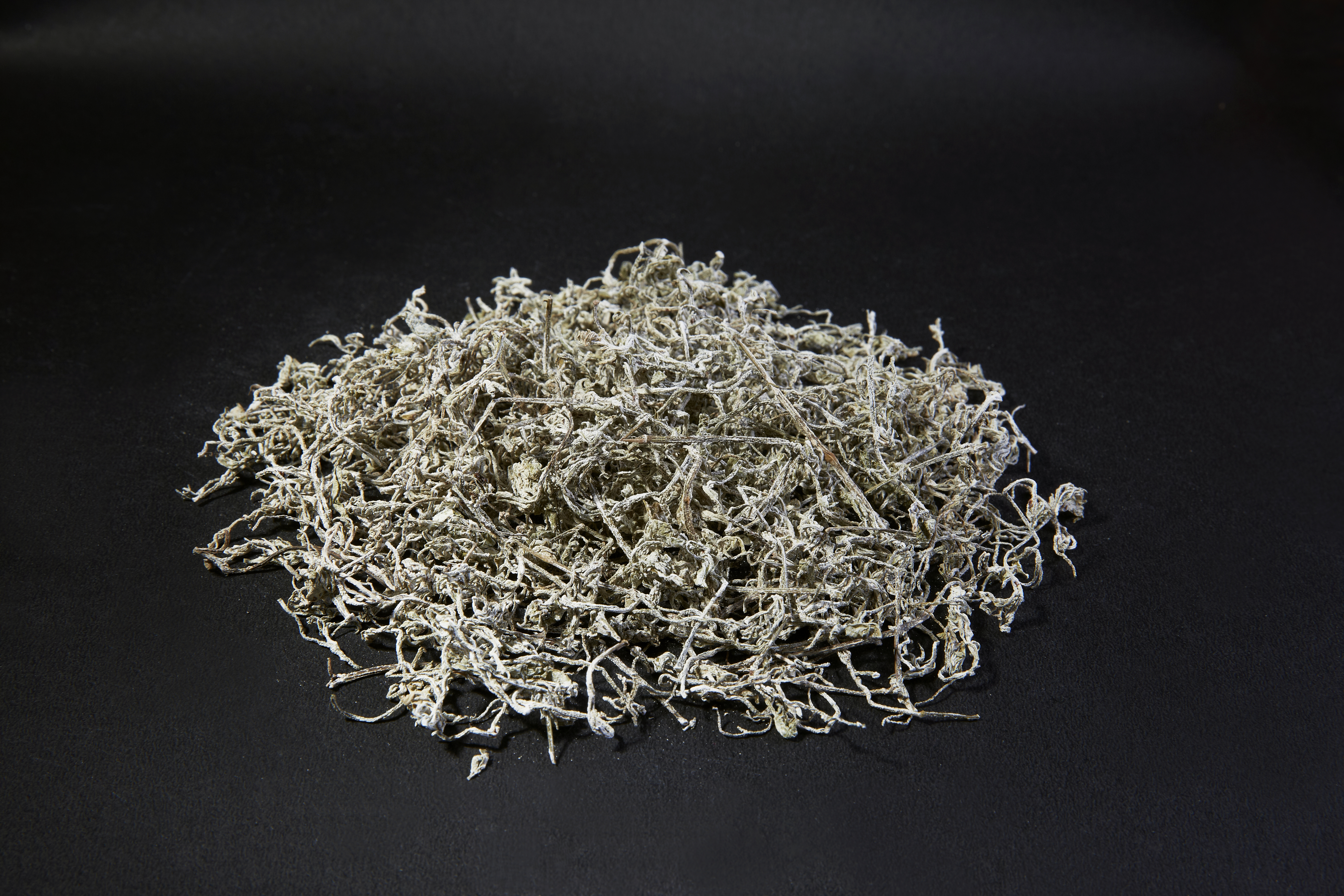
Processed moyeam

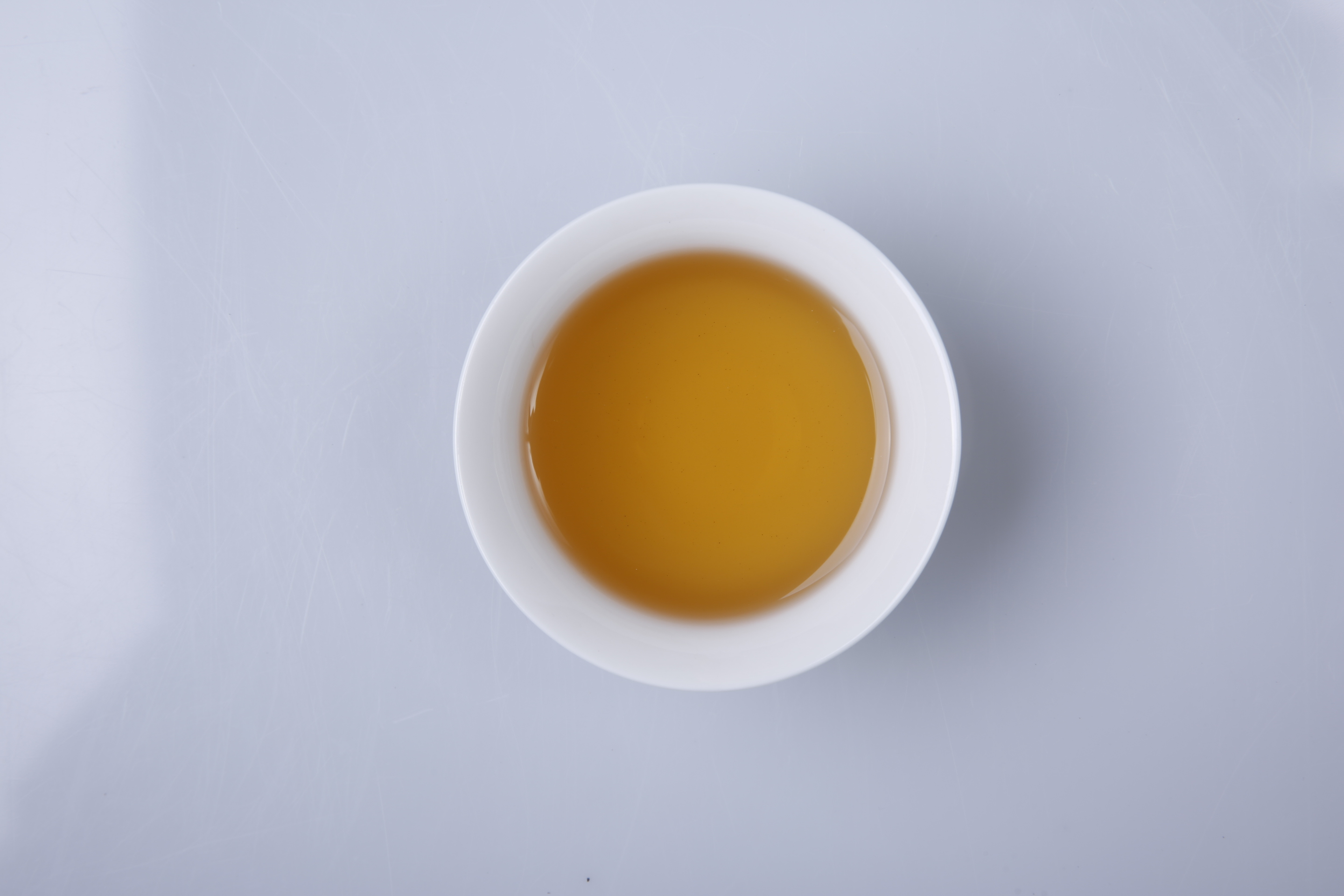
Moyeam tea

Nekemias grossedentata is a species of plant in the family Vitaceae whose leaves and stems are used to make a tisane known as vine tea, moyeam (Chinese: 茅岩莓, romanized: máo yán méi), or tengcha (Chinese: 藤茶, romanized: téng chá). It is mainly distributed in central and southern China and Indochina. Most moyeam is grown in Zhangjiajie, a mountainous region in Hunan Province in central China. The synonym Ampelopsis grossedentata is still commonly encountered in the media and literature.

== Plant features ==
Moyeam germinates in the spring and fades in the autumn. There is no significant difference between its primary and secondary roots. Stems and leaves are glabrous, and stem diameter is about 0.2–0.4 cm (0.079–0.157 in). The largest annual production is in early summer, followed by autumn. Average annual growth is 0.7–0.8 m (2.3–2.6 ft). The dorsal leaves are gray in the spring. Leaflets are thin, papery, or herbaceous, long, narrow, oblong, oval or needle-shaped. Their margins are coarsely toothed. Young stems and leaves are light reddish purple.

== Production and processing ==
The method of processing this plant was developed by the Tujia minority group 600 years ago. It involves plucking, withering, rolling, and fermenting the leaves. The fresh leaves should be withered within five hours to avoid oxidization and loss of nutrients. The rolling step produces its distinctive "white frost" color and enhances the flavor. Unoxidized "white" moyeam is also produced, but the more demanding production process for white moyeam (similar to the method by which green tea is produced) makes it more expensive than traditional moyeam. Its distinctive taste is slightly bitter with a strongly sweet aftertaste; the slightly grassy flavor is somewhat different from other common teas in China.

== Use ==
In Tujia settlements, it is common to prepare this tea in a similar manner as green tea and drink it directly for a naturally sweet flavor. Vine(moyeam) tea exhibits a wide range of significant bioactivities including anti-oxidant, anti-inflammatory and neuroprotective activities. Vine tea and its main bioactive component, dihydromyricetin have been suggested as potential natural antioxidants to extend shelf life of foods. This plant is also rich in flavonoids, which is used in a variety of nutraceutical, pharmaceutical and cosmetic applications.

== Nutritional values and chemical composition ==
Moyeam is rich in flavonoids, primarily dihydromyricetin; the average level in this plant can reach 40%. It is becoming more popular with Chinese people, particularly among health-conscious consumers, due to its high level of flavonoids. It does not contain the antioxidant epigallocatechin-3-gallate (EGCG) found in green tea.

== Geographical environment ==
Moyeam grows in Zhangjiajie's high mountains at 800–1500 m in elevation. The water, air and soil are isolated from contamination. The red sandstone soil is rich in nutrients, which is very conducive to the formation of flavonoids, vitamins and trace elements in this plant.

Similar plants are also found in other provinces of China, mainly south of the Yangtze River. A few studies have also mentioned its growth in southeast Asia countries.

== History ==
In 1385, it was given to the king of the Tujia minority as a present that was claimed to cure diseases. At that time, it was named "heaven tea". In 1837, during the Qing dynasty, it was given to the Emperor of China as a present from the Tujia. The Emperor found that the tea had amazing health effects, so he ordered that the tea be exclusively for himself.

Moyeam is still made using the 600-year-old method of the Tujia. It is said that only females are taught how to make it.
