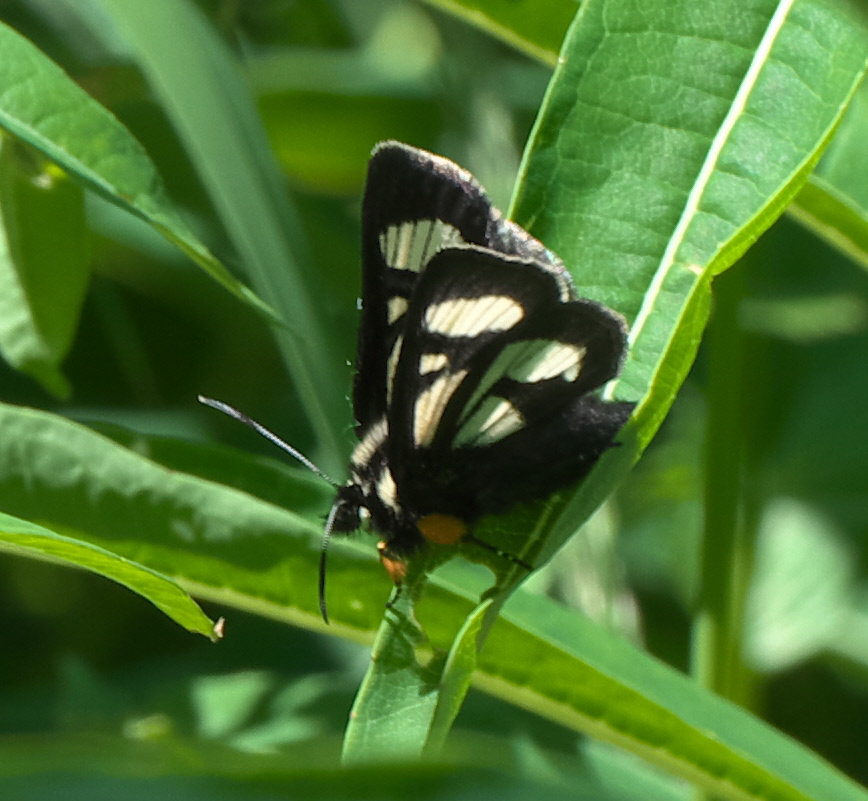
- Androloma maccullochii

Scientific classification
- Domain: Eukaryota
- Kingdom: Animalia
- Phylum: Arthropoda
- Class: Insecta
- Order: Lepidoptera
- Superfamily: Noctuoidea
- Family: Noctuidae
- Subfamily: Agaristinae
- Genus: Androloma; Grote, 1873

= Androloma =

Genus of moths

Androloma is a genus of moths of the family Noctuidae.

== Species ==
- Androloma brannani (Stretch, 1872)
- Androloma disparata (H. Edwards, 1884)
- Androloma maccullochii (Kirby, 1837)
