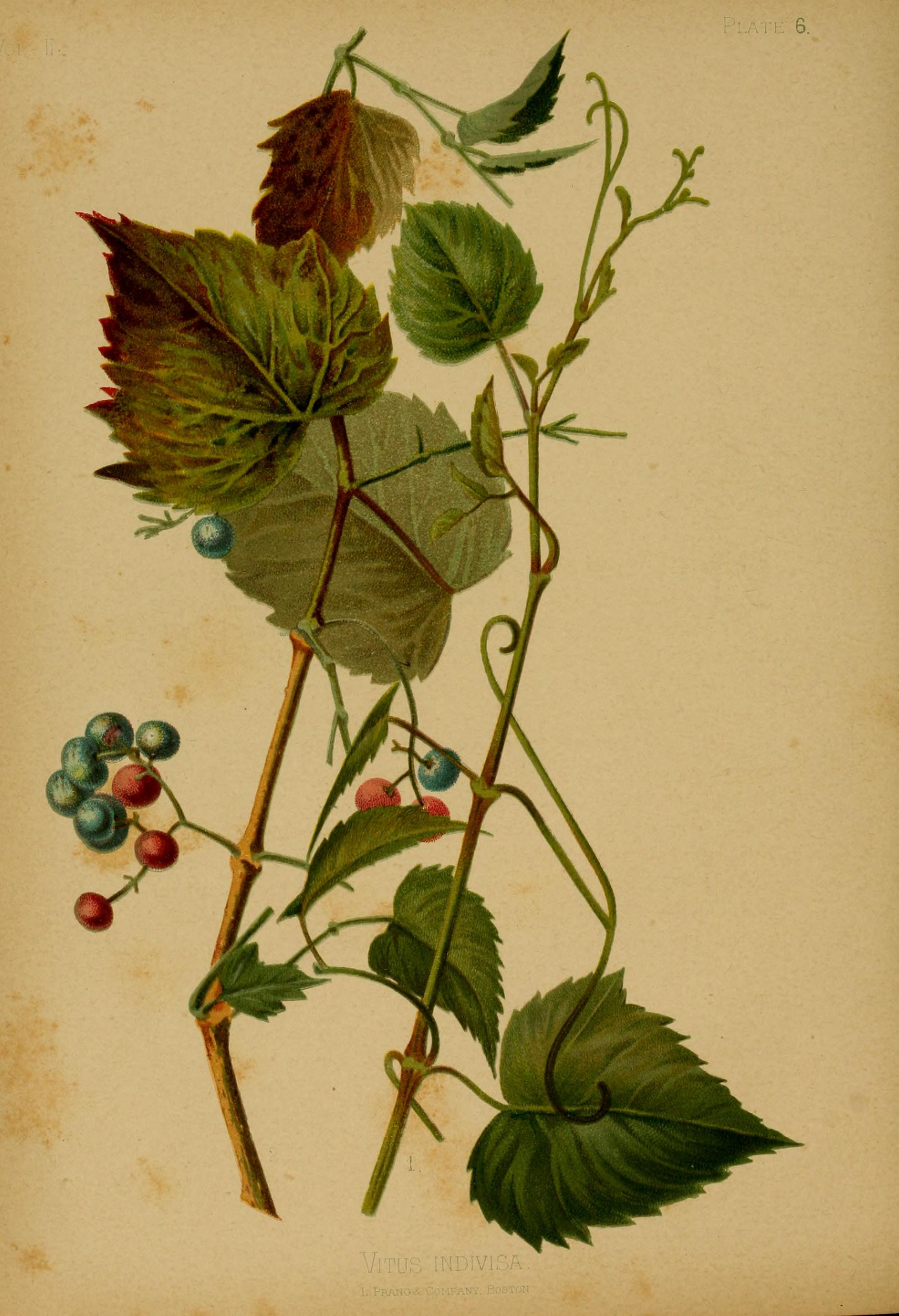

Scientific classification
- Kingdom: Plantae
- Clade: Tracheophytes
- Clade: Angiosperms
- Clade: Eudicots
- Clade: Rosids
- Order: Vitales
- Family: Vitaceae
- Genus: Ampelopsis
- Species: A. cordata

Binomial name
- Ampelopsis cordata Michx.

Synonyms
- Vitis indivisa Willd. Vitis cordata Dum.-Cours. Cissus indivisa Desmoul. Cissus ampelopsis Pers. Ampelopsis cordifolia Rafin.

= Ampelopsis cordata =

Species of vine

Ampelopsis cordata, commonly called heart-leaf peppervine, is a vine in the grape family (Vitaceae), native to much of the Eastern United States.

== Description ==
Ampelopsis cordata is a deciduous perennial that grows as a liana. It has simple, deltoid to ovate leaves with serrate margins, arranged alternately. Its stems are glabrous. Its flowers are greenish-white and borne in clusters, blooming in late spring and early summer. The fruits are berries which are purple to pink at maturity; they are edible but unpalatable.

=== Similar Species ===
It is overall similar in appearance to many grapevine species (genus Vitis), but can be distinguished by its white pith (compared to Vitis species, which typically have brown pith), as well as its more compact inflorescences and different-looking fruits. Throughout most of its range it co-occurs with invasive Ampelopsis glandulosa, which differs in having hairy young stems and leaves that are often much more lobed.

== Distribution and habitat ==
It is found in the U.S. states Alabama, Arkansas, Connecticut, Delaware, Florida, Georgia, Iowa, Illinois, Indiana, Kansas, Kentucky, Louisiana, Maryland, Missouri, Mississippi, North Carolina, Nebraska, Ohio, Oklahoma, South Carolina, Tennessee, Texas, Virginia, West Virginia. It grows in open woodlands, flood plains, and river banks.
