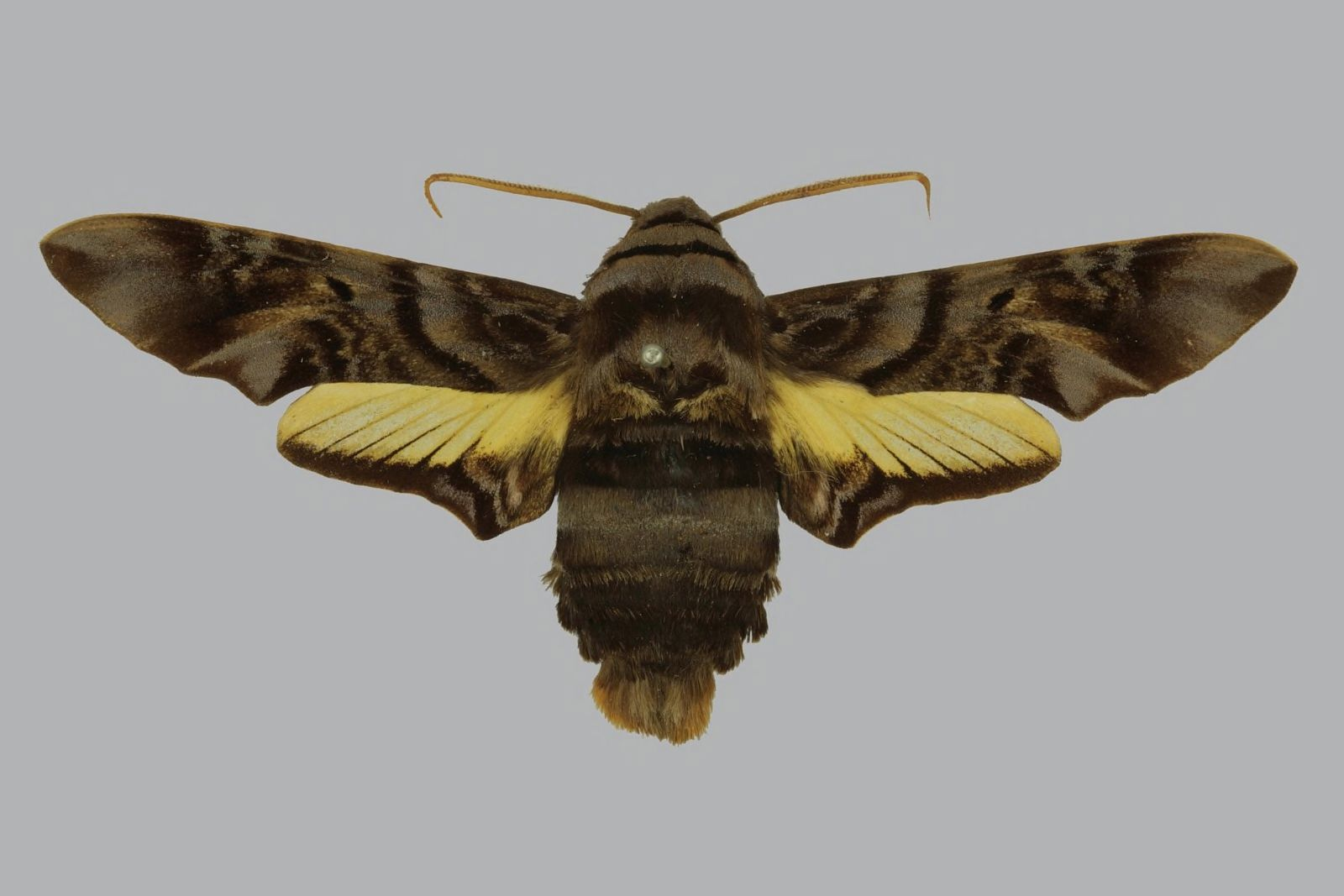

Scientific classification
- Domain: Eukaryota
- Kingdom: Animalia
- Phylum: Arthropoda
- Class: Insecta
- Order: Lepidoptera
- Family: Sphingidae
- Genus: Sphecodina
- Species: S. caudata

Binomial name
- Sphecodina caudata (Bremer & Grey, 1853)

Synonyms
- Macroglossa caudata Bremer & Grey, 1853; Sphecodina caudata angulifascia (Mell, 1922); Sphecodina caudata angulilimbata Clark, 1923; Sphecodina caudata meridionalis Mell, 1922

= Sphecodina caudata =

Species of moth

Sphecodina caudata is a moth of the family Sphingidae. It is found in the southern Russian Far East, the Korean Peninsula, eastern and southern China and northern Thailand.

The wingspan is 62–67 mm.
