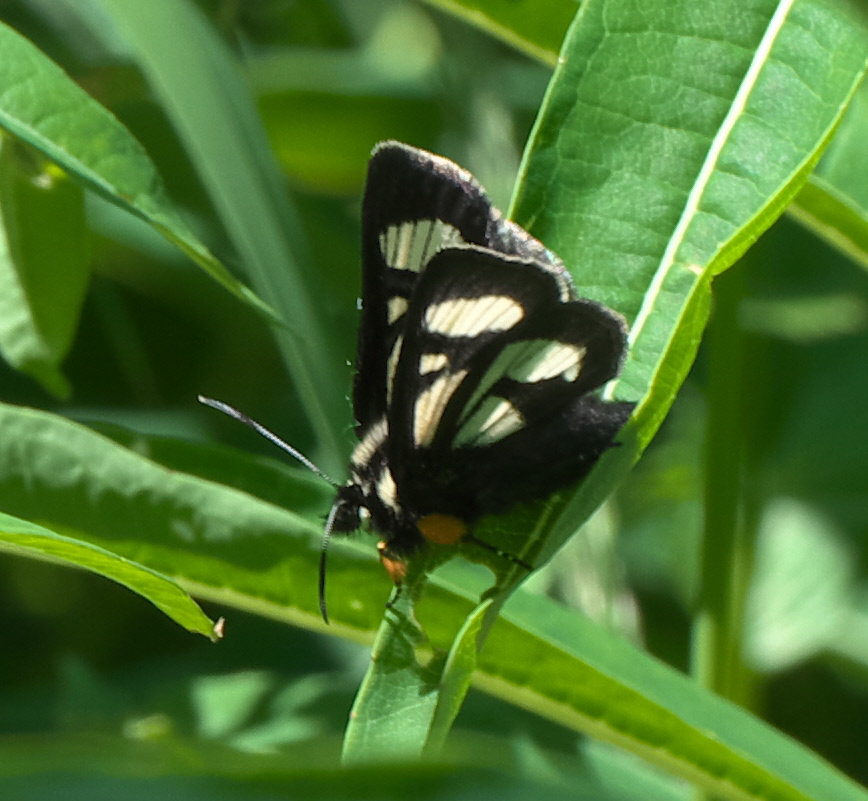

Scientific classification
- Domain: Eukaryota
- Kingdom: Animalia
- Phylum: Arthropoda
- Class: Insecta
- Order: Lepidoptera
- Superfamily: Noctuoidea
- Family: Noctuidae
- Genus: Androloma
- Species: A. maccullochii

Binomial name
- Androloma maccullochii (W. Kirby, 1837)

= Androloma maccullochii =

Species of moth

Androloma maccullochii, or Macculloch's forester, is an owlet moth (family Noctuidae). The species was first described by William Kirby in 1837. It is found in North America.

The MONA or Hodges number for Androloma maccullochii is 9321.
