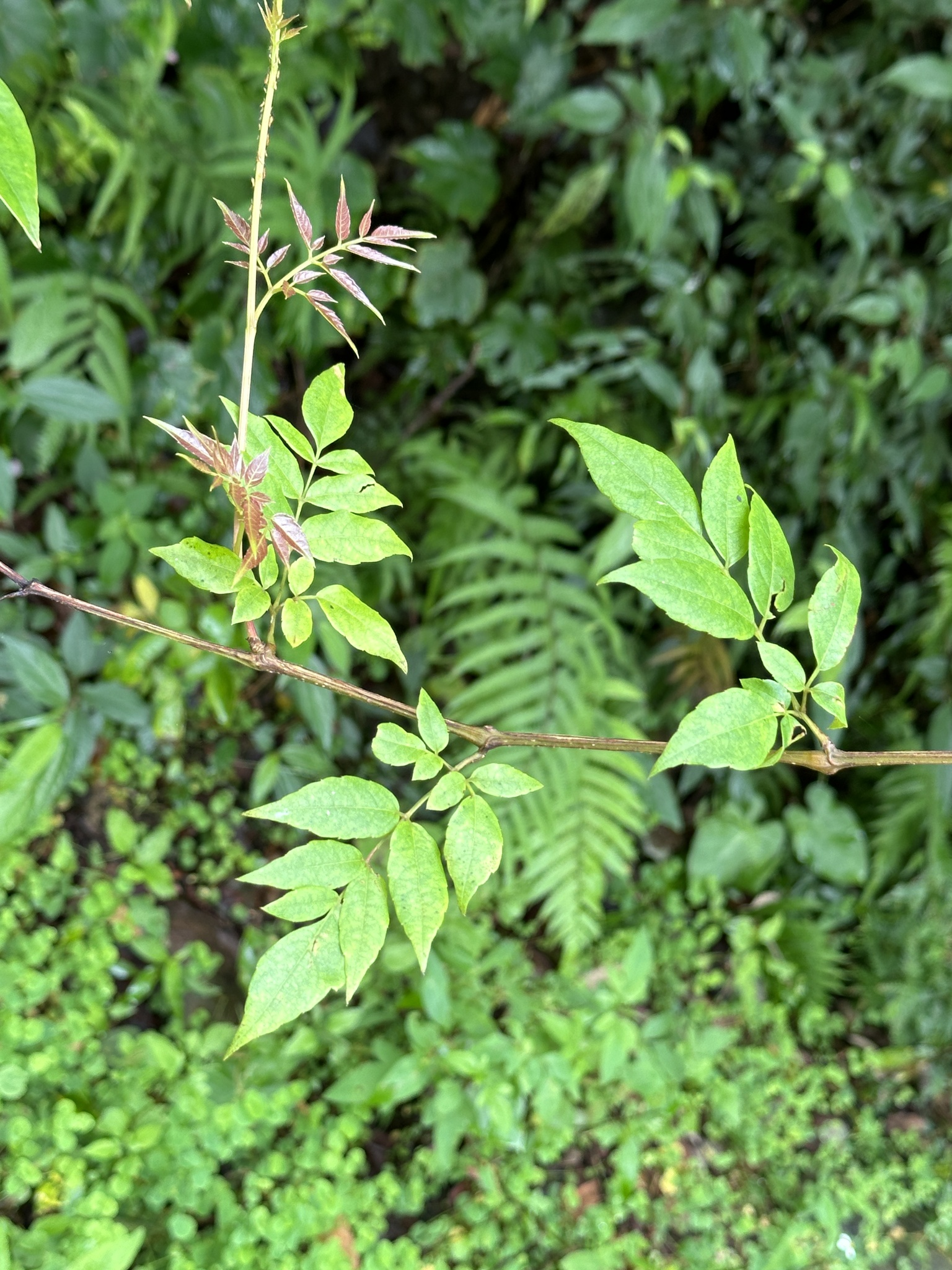
- In Taiwan

Scientific classification
- Kingdom: Plantae
- Clade: Tracheophytes
- Clade: Angiosperms
- Clade: Eudicots
- Clade: Rosids
- Order: Vitales
- Family: Vitaceae
- Genus: Nekemias
- Species: N. cantoniensis

Binomial name
- Nekemias cantoniensis (Hook. & Arn.) K.Koch

Synonyms
- Ampelopsis annamensis Gagnep.; Ampelopsis cantoniensis (Hook. & Arn.) K.Koch; Ampelopsis cantoniensis var. leeoides (Maxim.) F.Y.Lu; Ampelopsis hypoglauca (Hance) C.L.Li; Ampelopsis leeoides (Maxim.) Planch.; Ampelopsis loureiroi Planch.; Cissus cantoniensis Hook. & Arn.; Leea theifera H. Lév.; Vitis cantoniensis (Hook. & Arn.) Seem.; Vitis leeoides Maxim.; Vitis multijugata H. Lév. & Vaniot

= Nekemias cantoniensis =

Species of plant

Nekemias cantoniensis, is a vine native to China, Japan, Malaysia, Thailand, and Vietnam. It was previously placed as several species in the genus Ampelopsis.
