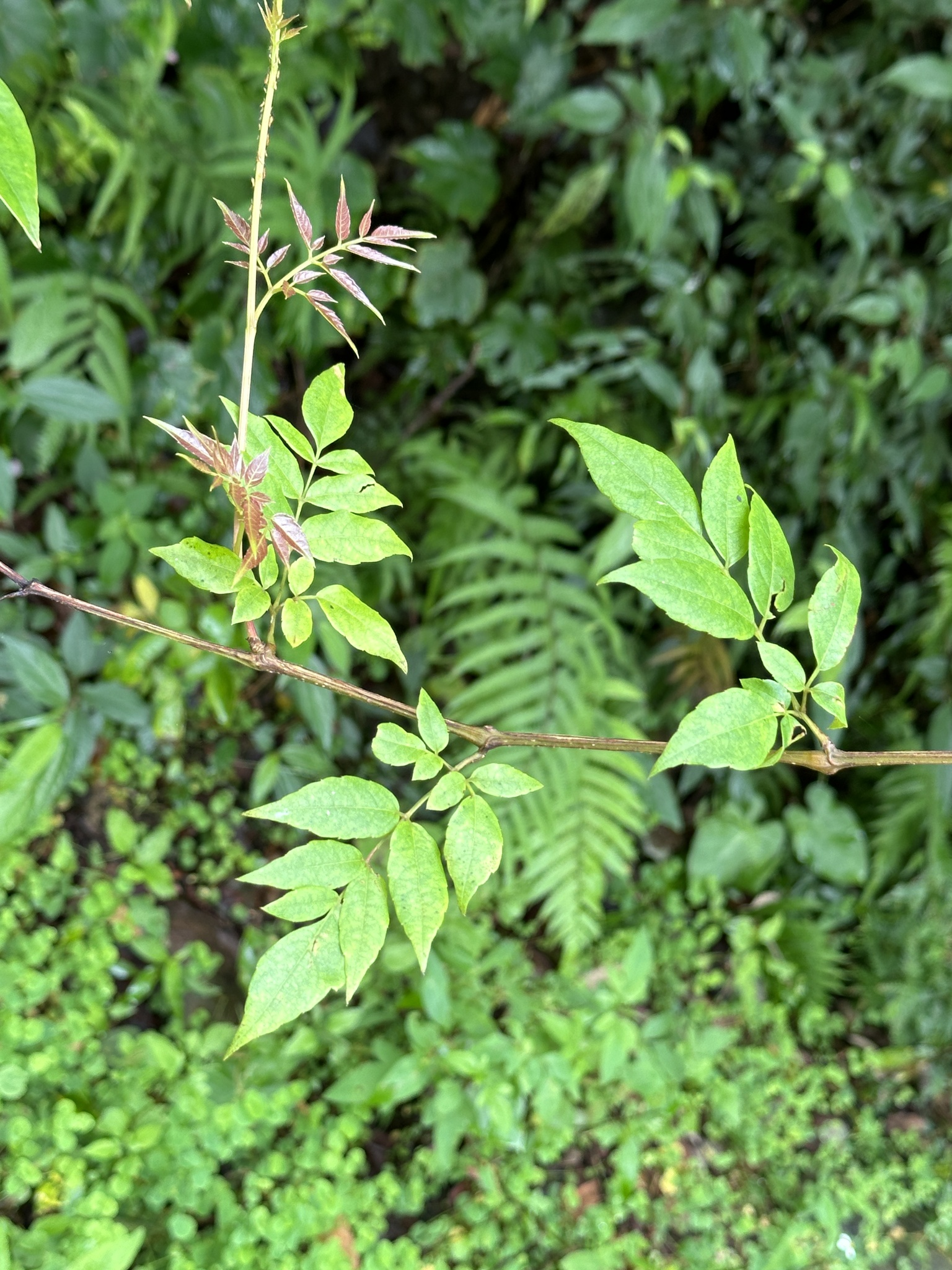
- Nekemias cantoniensis in Taiwan

Scientific classification
- Kingdom: Plantae
- Clade: Tracheophytes
- Clade: Angiosperms
- Clade: Eudicots
- Clade: Rosids
- Order: Vitales
- Family: Vitaceae
- Subfamily: Vitoideae
- Genus: Nekemias; Raf.

= Nekemias =

Genus of grapevines

Nekemias is a genus of flowering plants belonging to the family Vitaceae.

Its native range is Assam to Temperate Eastern Asia and Western and Central Malesia, Central and Eastern USA.

== Species ==
Plants of the World Online currently includes:

- Nekemias arborea (L.) J.Wen & Boggan
- Nekemias cantoniensis (Hook. & Arn.) J.Wen & Z.L.Nie (synonym N. hypoglauca)
- Nekemias celebica (Suess.) J.Wen & Boggan
- Nekemias chaffanjonii (H.Lév. & Vaniot) J.Wen & Z.L.Nie
- Nekemias gongshanensis (C.L.Li) J.Wen & Z.L.Nie
- Nekemias grossedentata (Hand.-Mazz.) J.Wen & Z.L.Nie
- Nekemias megalophylla (Diels & Gilg) J.Wen & Z.L.Nie
- Nekemias rubifolia (Wall.) J.Wen & Z.L.Nie
