= Ampelopsin =

Names
- IUPAC name (2R,3R)-3,3′,4′,5,5′,7-Hexahydroxyflavan-4-one
- Systematic IUPAC name (2R,3R)-3,5,7-Trihydroxy-2-(3,4,5-trihydroxy)-2,3-dihydro-4H-1-benzopyran-4-one
- Other names Dihydromyricetin, Ampeloptin,(+)-Ampelopsin,(+)-Dihydromyricetin

Identifiers
CAS Number	27200-12-0
3D model (JSmol)	Interactive image
ChEBI	CHEBI:28429
ChemSpider	16735660
PubChem CID	161557
UNII	KD8QND6427
CompTox Dashboard (EPA)	DTXSID50181676
- InChI: InChI=1S/C15H12O8/c16-6-3-7(17)11-10(4-6)23-15(14(22)13(11)21)5-1-8(18)12(20)9(19)2-5/h1-4,14-20,22H/t14-,15+/m1/s1 Key: KJXSIXMJHKAJOD-CABCVRRESA-N; InChI=1/C15H12O8/c16-6-3-7(17)11-10(4-6)23-15(14(22)13(11)21)5-1-8(18)12(20)9(19)2-5/h1-4,14-20,22H/t14-,15+/m1/s1 Key: KJXSIXMJHKAJOD-CABCVRREBP
- SMILES: Oc1cc(cc(O)c1O)[C@@H]3Oc2cc(O)cc(O)c2C(=O)[C@H]3O

Properties
Chemical formula	C_{15}H_{12}O_{8}
Molar mass	320.253 g·mol^{−1}
- Except where otherwise noted, data are given for materials in their standard state (at 25 °C [77 °F], 100 kPa). verify (what is ?) Infobox references

Ampelopsin, also known as dihydromyricetin and DHM, when used as an herbal medicine, is a flavanonol, a type of flavonoid. It is extracted from the Japanese raisin tree and found in Ampelopsis species japonica, megalophylla, and grossedentata; Cercidiphyllum japonicum; Hovenia dulcis; Rhododendron cinnabarinum; some Pinus species; and some Cedrus species, as well as in Salix sachalinensis.

Hovenia dulcis has been used in traditional Japanese, Chinese, and Korean medicines to treat fever, parasitic infection, as a laxative, and a treatment of liver diseases, and as a hangover treatment. Methods have been developed to extract ampelopsin on a larger scale, and laboratory research has been conducted with the compound to see if it might be useful as a drug in any of the conditions for which the parent plant has been traditionally used.

== Research ==
Research suggests that ampelopsin protects against doxorubicin-induced cardiotoxicity by inhibiting NLRP3 inflammasome activation via stimulation of the SIRT1 pathway. In a study of 60 patients with non-alcoholic fatty liver disease, ampelopsin improved glucose and lipid metabolism and yielded potentially beneficial anti-inflammatory effects. A study of rats demonstrated pharmacological properties of ampelopsin which suggest it would be a therapeutic candidate to treat alcohol use disorders.

Additional research is required before claims of human efficacy and application, necessary dosage, and solutions to poor bioavailability, are met with scientific validation.

== Purported benefits ==
Ampelopsin has been claimed to possess various health, wellness, and cosmetic benefits, including:

- Anti-alcohol intoxication: ampelopsin is widely used in hangover remedies due to its claimed ability to accelerate alcohol breakdown in the liver and mitigate alcohol-induced damage. However, a pharmacokinetic study found no effect of DHM on alcohol metabolism.
- Cosmetic applications: ampelopsin is used in skincare products for its purported ability to protect skin from UV-induced damage and aging.
