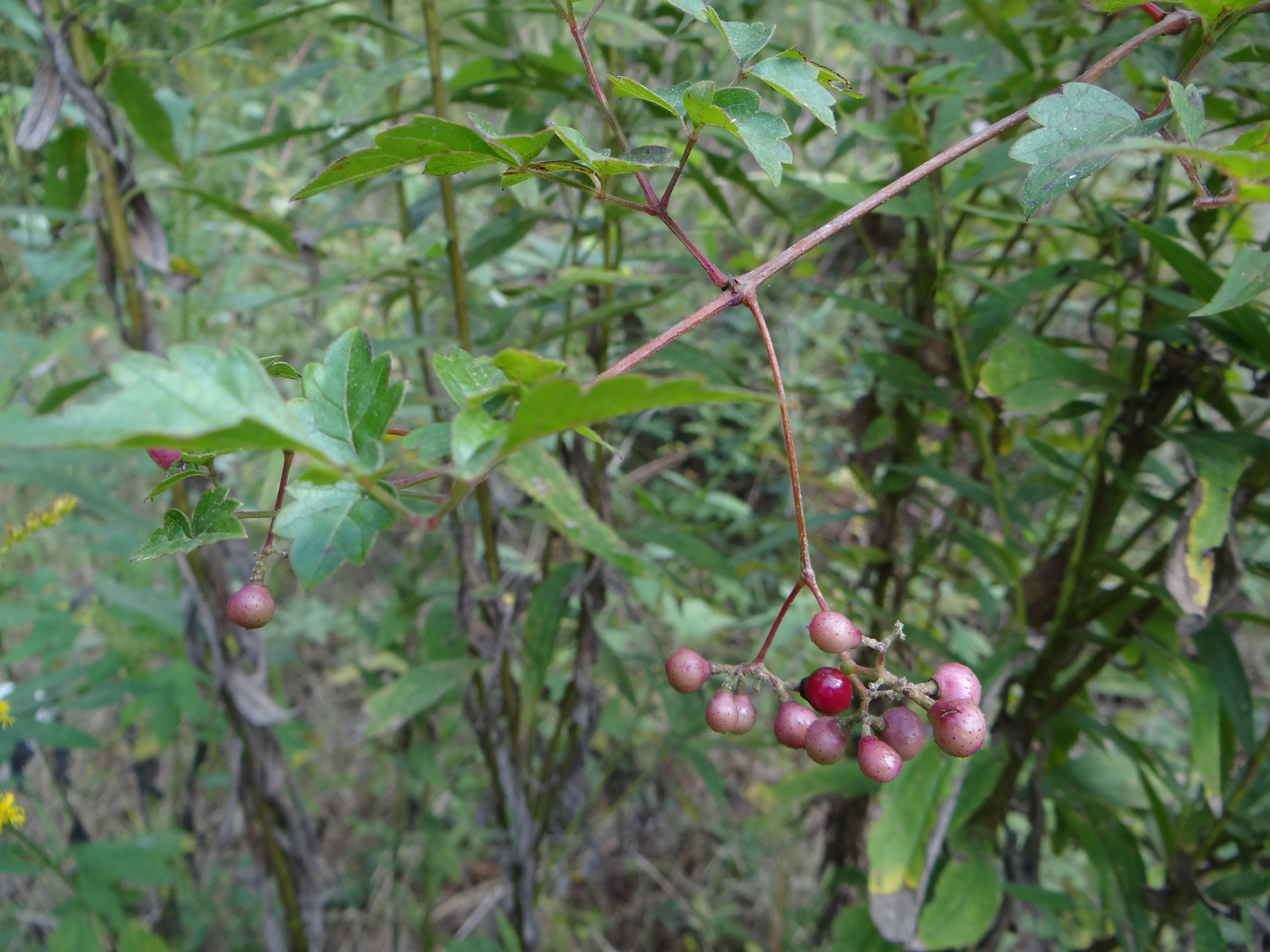

Conservation status
- Secure (NatureServe)

Scientific classification
- Kingdom: Plantae
- Clade: Tracheophytes
- Clade: Angiosperms
- Clade: Eudicots
- Clade: Rosids
- Order: Vitales
- Family: Vitaceae
- Genus: Nekemias
- Species: N. arborea

Binomial name
- Nekemias arborea (L.) J.Wen & Boggan

= Nekemias arborea =

Pepper vine

Species of vine

Nekemias arborea, commonly known as pepper vine, is native to the Southeastern United States, Texas, and New Mexico. It spreads rapidly, climbing up trees and bushes. It prefers moist soils, such as stream banks, and disturbed areas.

== Description ==
It is a deciduous to semi-evergreen vine that can be ground cover-like, but is often high-climbing and bushy. It grows to 35 feet (11 m) or more in length.

Leaves are alternate, bi-pinnately divided and up to 6 inches (15 cm) long and wide. There are one to three pairs of leaflets. They are roughly ovate and coarsely toothed, dark green on the upper surface, and lighter on the lower surface. Newly emerged leaves are purple-red and change to a light green to dark green as they reach mature size. Foliage turns pale yellow or red in fall.

Flat-topped clusters of tiny, green flowers are followed by clusters of pea-sized, bluish-purple berries. The fruit is fleshy, up to 5/8 inch (16 mm) in diameter, and black and shiny when ripe. The fruit attracts wildlife, but is possibly poisonous for humans.

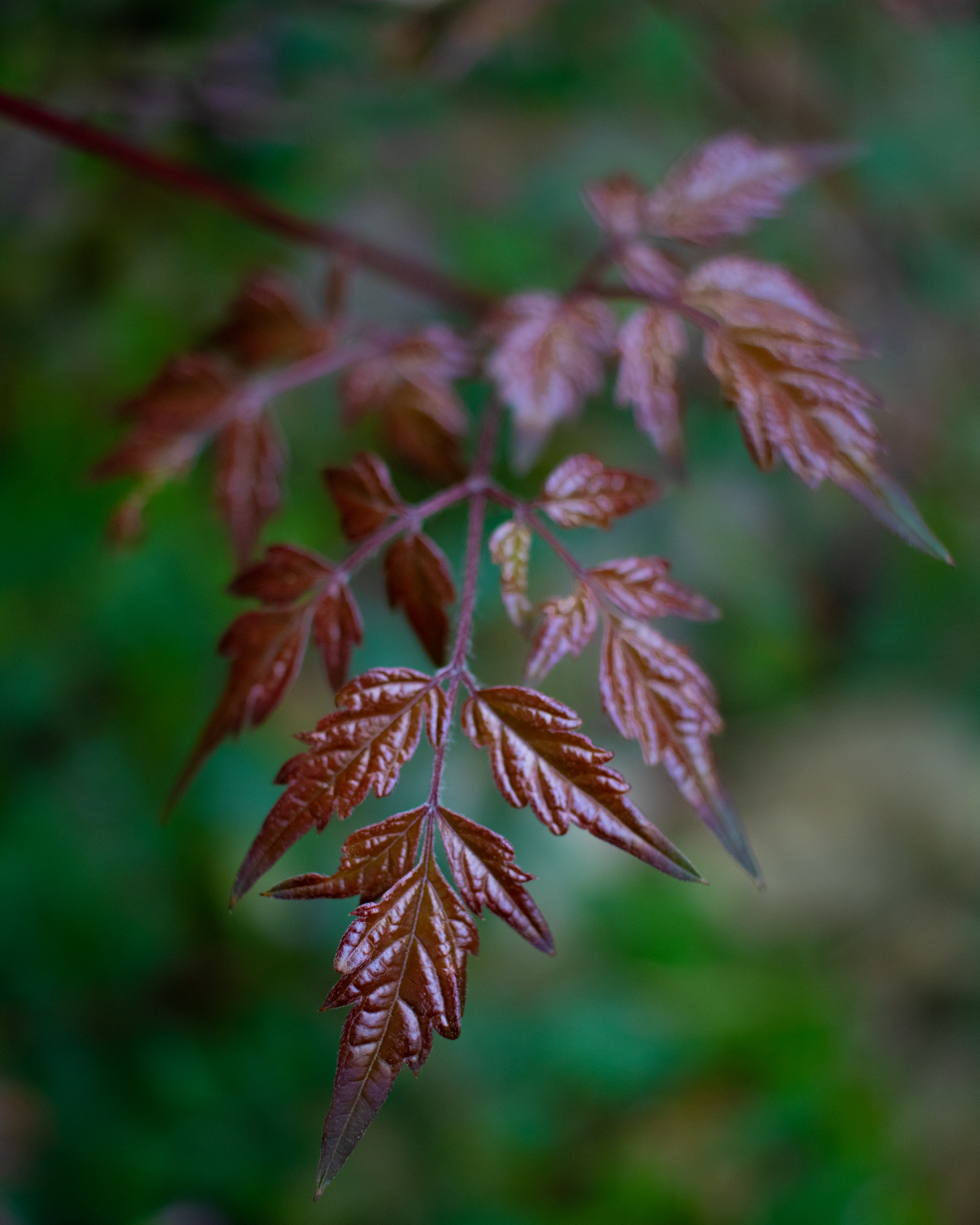
When young, the leaves of Nekemias arborea are a deep red color.

== Synonyms ==
Its synonyms include: Ampelopsis arborea (L.) Koehne, Ampelopsis bipinnata Michx., Ampelopsis pinnata DC., Cissus arborea (L.) Des Moul., Cissus bipinnata Elliott, Cissus orientalis Lam., Cissus stans Pers., Hedera arborea (L.) Walter, Nekemias bipinnata Raf., Vitis arborea L., Vitis bipinnata Torr. & A.Gray, and Vitis orientalis (Lam.) Boiss.

== Cultivation ==
Nekemias arborea is used as an ornamental plant in gardens.
