= Teru =

Teru may refer to:

- Teru (woreda), a district of Afar Region, Ethiopia
- Ampelocissus abyssinica or Teru, an Ethiopian climbing vine

== People with the name ==
Mononym

- Mika Saiki or Teru, beach volleyball player
- Teru (singer), vocalist of GLAY
- Teru (guitarist), guitarist for Versailles and Jupiter

Personal name

- Teru Clavel, Japanese-American author
- Teru Fukui, politician, a member of the Liberal Democratic Party
- Teru Hasegawa, Japanese Esperantist,
- Teru Hayashi, Japanese-American cell biologist
- Teru Miyamoto, Japanese author
- Teru Shimada, Japanese-American actor
- Takakura Teru, Japanese novelist
- Matsudaira Teru, 19th-century aristocrat
- Kushihashi Teru, Japanese noble lady

Surname

- Misuzu Kaneko or Kaneko Teru, poet

=== Fictional ===
- Teru Mikami, a character in Death Note
- Teru Kurebayashi, the main character in Dengeki Daisy
- Teru Minamoto, an exorcist high-school student and supporting character in Toilet-Bound Hanako-kun
- Teru Tendou, a character in The Idolmaster SideM

== See also ==
- Teru teru bozu, a traditional Japanese handmade doll
- GodHand Teru, a Japanese manga
- Teruhisa Moriyama, former volleyball player
