= A. concinna =

A. concinna may refer to:

- Acacia concinna, a climbing shrub
- Acontista concinna, an Ecuadorian praying mantis
- Aegialia concinna, a beetle endemic to the United States
- Aiphanes concinna, an American spiny palm
- Alcadia concinna, a land snail
- Amalda concinna, a sea snail
- Ampelocissus concinna, an Angolan climbing vine
- Amphiura concinna, a brittle star
- Anatoma concinna, a sea snail
- Antennulariella concinna, a sac fungus
- Anathallis concinna, a flowering plant
- Areca concinna, a flowering plant
- Argia concinna, a pond damselfly
