= Clavel =

Clavel is a French and Spanish surname. Notable people with the surname include:

- Ana Clavel (born 1961), Mexican writer
- Ana Yancy Clavel (born 1992), Salvadorian model
- Antoine Pierre de Clavel (1734–1797), French Navy officer
- Aurora Clavel (1936–2025), Mexican film actress
- Bernard Clavel (1923–2010), French writer
- Enrique Arancibia Clavel (1944–2011), Chilean anti-communist
- Héctor Clavel (1920–1982), Chilean equestrian
- Johana Clavel (born 1985), Venezuelan chef
- Kim Clavel (born 1990), Canadian boxer
- Maurice Clavel (1920–1979), French writer
- Reymond Clavel (born 1950), Swiss roboticist
- Robert Clavel (1912–1991), French art director
- Rudy Clavel (born 1996), Salvadoran footballer
- Teru Clavel, Japanese-American author

== See also ==
- Minor planet 2461 Clavel
- The Carnation flower, the Spanish name for which is "Clavel"
