= Lanbi =

Lanbi may refer to:

- Ampelocissus africana, a woody vine of the grape family
- Lanbi Kyun, an island in the Mergui Archipelago, Burma
