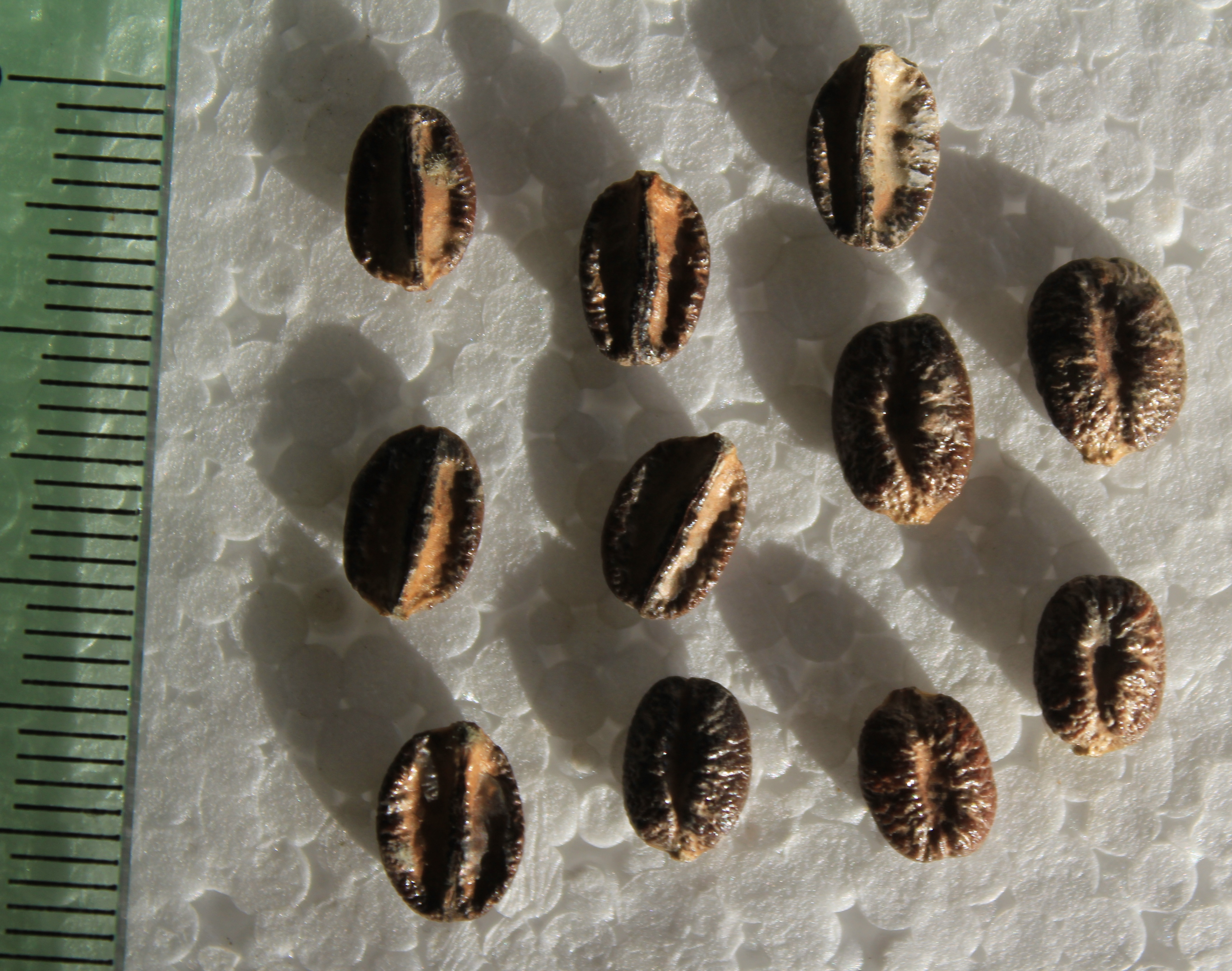

Scientific classification
- Kingdom: Plantae
- Clade: Embryophytes
- Clade: Tracheophytes
- Clade: Angiosperms
- Clade: Eudicots
- Clade: Rosids
- Order: Vitales
- Family: Vitaceae
- Genus: Ampelocissus
- Species: A. martini

Binomial name
- Ampelocissus martini Planch.

Synonyms
- Vitis martinellii Planch.; Vitis martini (Planch.) Ridl.

= Ampelocissus martini =

Species of plant

Ampelocissus martini is a species of climber or shrub in the Vitaceae family. Some sources use the spelling Ampelocissus martinii. It is native to an area of Mainland Southeast Asia. The fruit are eaten by people and by several species of Pangasiidae shark catfish of the Mekong river.

== Taxonomy ==
Chloroplast DNA analysis indicates that A. martini is in a clade with sisters Ampelocissus elephantina and Ampelocissus latifolia.

The species was named by the French botanist Jules Émile Planchon (1823–1888), a longstanding academic at University of Montpellier. The work Planchon carried out included much on the Vitaceae family, and other vines. This name was published in 1884 in the journal Vigne Americaine et La Viticulture en Europe (Paris & Mâcon, also known as Journ. Vigne Am.)

== Description ==
A climber or shrub. Some of the distinguishing characteristics of this species of Ampelocissus are leaves that are simple but sometimes lobed; arachnoid hairs on stems and petioles along with dark erect glandular hairs; pyramidal or elongated compact inflorescence, longer than wide, absent pedicels, or less than 1 mm long; the flowers are either sessile or with less than 0.4 mm long pedicels. It flowers in July and August in Cambodia, with fruiting occurring in September and October and leaves present from May to November.

== Distribution ==
The species is native to an area within Mainland Southeast Asia. Countries and regions that it occurs in are: Malaysia (Peninsular Malaysia); Thailand; Cambodia; Vietnam; Laos.

== Habitat and ecology ==
Prefers sunny exposure, often in mixed stands with Ampelocissus arachnoidea.

Doi Khun Tan National Park is in northern Thailand, among the ecocommunities occurring there are areas of the original lowland forest, deciduous forest with bamboo, dominated by Tectona grandis and growing at 325 to 850 m (1,070 to 2,790 ft) elevation. Deciduous perennial vines are common, they include A. martini, and are regarded as distinct from the thicker liana taxa.

The community-protected forest Khok Bung Preu (Dan Khun Thot District, Nakhon Ratchasima Province, northeast Thailand) is a remnant lowland deciduous forest, where the most common trees are Sindora siamensis, Xylia xylocarpa var. kerrii, Erythrophleum succirubrum, and Bauhinia saccocalyx. The forest is used by the local communities to gather wild plants, including A. martini. The forest protection has occurred in the face of violence.

The climber grows in the forest along the Mekong river in Kratie and Steung Treng Provinces, Cambodia. It is moderately abundant in the deciduous forest with bamboo formation and in degraded areas, on soils derived from metamorphic sandstone bedrock, at 25–30 m (82–98 ft) altitude.

The catfish Pangasius conchophilus and Pangasius polyuranodon of the Mekong river in southern Laos eat the fruit of the species. The fish are able to obtain access to the seasonally flooded forests surrounding the river.

== Vernacular names ==
- som kung (Thai language)
- ส้มกุ้ง (Thai name)
- tumpèang ba:y chu:(r) préi (="wild grape", préi="wild", Khmer language)
- sam hong (Vietnamese language)
- kheua koi (kheua=generic name for vines, Lao language)

== Uses ==
The fruit is eaten, including, in Cambodia, unripe with salt. In the community forest of Khok Bung Preu (northeast Thailand), the wild fruit are one of a number of non-timber forest products gathered by the local people, mainly for sale, with no limit on quantities harvested.

The rhizome extracts of Ampelocissus martini included secondary metabolites, specifically flavonoids and phenolics, that function as effective reducing agents and stabilizers during the manufacture of zinc oxide nanoparticles.
