= Native grape =

Native grape may refer to certain plants within the family Vitaceae including:

- Cissus hypoglauca
- Cayratia clematidea

== See also ==
- Ampelocissus acetosa, wild grape
- Grape
