= Wild grape =

Wild grape may refer to:

- Vitis species; specially Vitis vinifera subsp. sylvestris (the wild ancestor of Vitis vinifera), Vitis californica (California wild grape), Vitis girdiana (desert wild grape), and Vitis riparia
- Ampelocissus acetosa, also known as Djabaru
- Ampelopsis glandulosa, also known as porcelain berry
- Cyphostemma juttae, a slow-growing ornamental plant.
