= Richard Strohman =

Biologist

- Born: May 5, 1927; Brooklyn, New York, US
- Died: July 4, 2009 (aged 82); Sonoma, California, US
- Education: Columbia University
- Known for: Criticism of genetic determinism
- Scientific career
- Fields: Molecular biology Cell biology
- Workplaces: University of California, Berkeley
- Thesis: Studies on the Enzymic Interactions of Bound Nucleotide of the Muscle Protein Actin (1958)
- Doctoral advisor: Teru Hayashi

Richard Campbell Strohman (May 5, 1927 – July 4, 2009) was an American cell biologist who taught at the University of California, Berkeley. He is known for his criticisms of genetic determinism and for his research on skeletal muscle development. His research on human muscle contributed to the scientific understanding of muscular dystrophy, and he served as the research director for the Muscular Dystrophy Association in 1990. While teaching at Berkeley, he supported the Free Speech Movement, and was a member of both the anti-Vietnam War Faculty Peace Committee and of the pro-nuclear disarmament Faculty for Social Responsibility. He was the director of the Health and Medical Sciences Program at Berkeley from 1976 to 1979. He retired from Berkeley's faculty in 1991, but still remained active in teaching classes there. He was a member of the American Society of Cell Biology and the Society for Developmental Biology, as well as a fellow of the American Association for the Advancement of Science.
