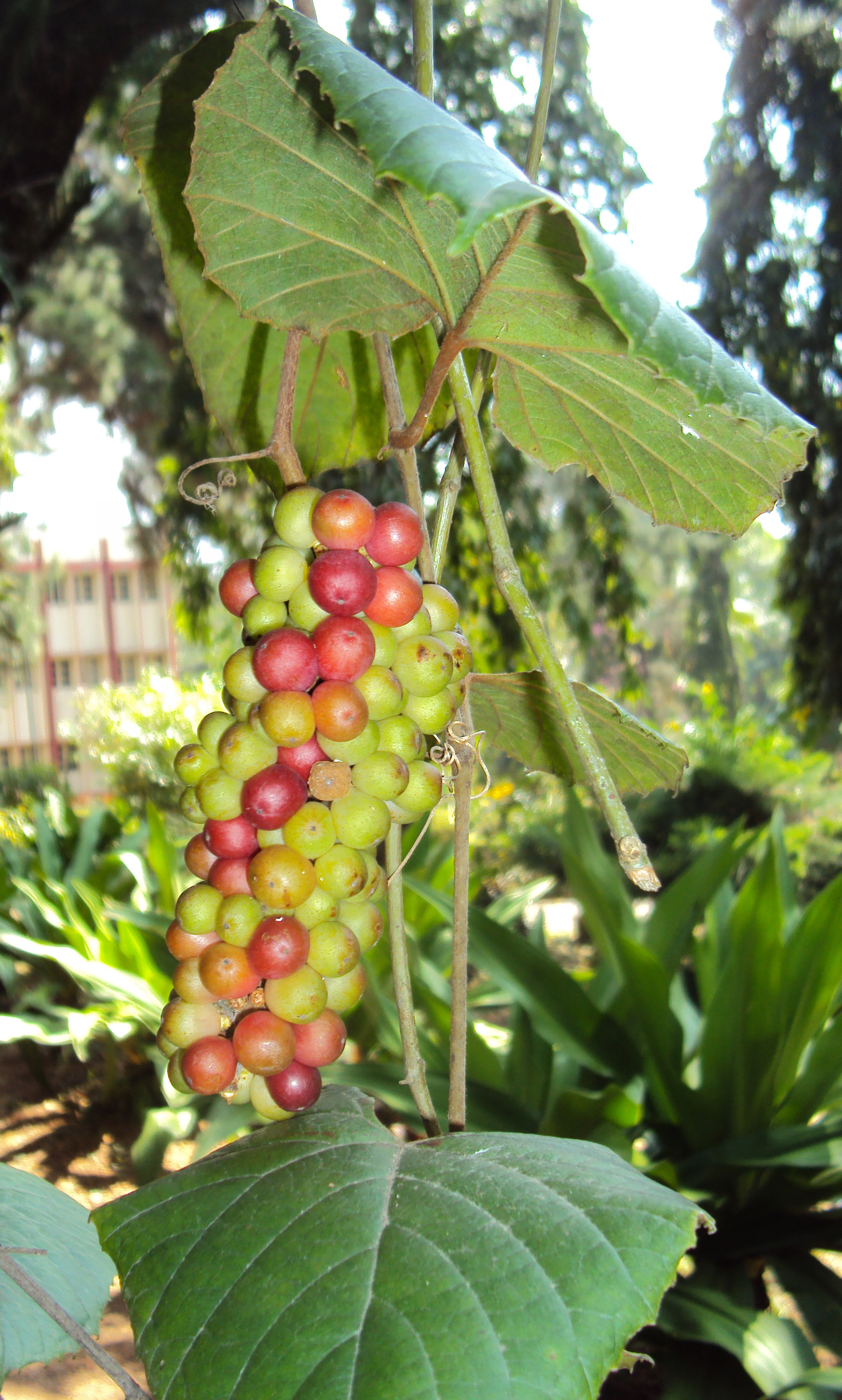
- Ampelocissus latifolia

Scientific classification
- Kingdom: Plantae
- Clade: Tracheophytes
- Clade: Angiosperms
- Clade: Eudicots
- Clade: Rosids
- Order: Vitales
- Family: Vitaceae
- Subfamily: Vitoideae
- Genus: Ampelocissus; Planch.

Species
- See text.

Synonyms
- Botria Lour.

= Ampelocissus =

Genus of vines

Ampelocissus is a genus of Vitaceae having 90 or more species found variously in tropical Africa, Asia, Central America, and Oceania. The type species, A. latifolia, was originally treated under its basionym, Vitis latifolia, and was collected from the Indian subcontinent.

Species of Ampelocissus are herbaceous or woody, hermaphroditic or polygamo-dioecious flowering plants with tendrils for climbing. Fruits are grape-like berries having 1-4 seeds. Their diploid chromosomal number is 40 (2n=40).

== Species ==
Plants of the World Online currently includes:

1. Ampelocissus abyssinica (Hochst. ex A.Rich.) Planch.
2. Ampelocissus acapulcensis (Kunth) Planch.
3. Ampelocissus acetosa (F.Muell.) Planch.
4. Ampelocissus aculeata (Span.) Planch.
5. Ampelocissus africana (Lour.) Merr.
6. Ampelocissus amentacea Ridl.
7. Ampelocissus angolensis (Baker) Planch.
8. Ampelocissus arachnoidea (Hassk.) Planch.
9. Ampelocissus araneosa (Dalzell) Gamble
10. Ampelocissus artemisiifolia Planch.
11. Ampelocissus ascendiflora Latiff
12. Ampelocissus asekii J.Wen, Kiapranis & Lovave
13. Ampelocissus banaensis Gagnep.
14. Ampelocissus barbata (Wall.) Planch.
15. Ampelocissus birii P.Singh & B.V.Shetty
16. Ampelocissus bombycina (Baker) Planch.
17. Ampelocissus borneensis Merr.
18. Ampelocissus botryostachys Planch.
19. Ampelocissus butoensis C.L.Li
20. Ampelocissus capillaris (Ridl.) Merr.
21. Ampelocissus cardiospermoides Planch.
22. Ampelocissus celebica Suess.
23. Ampelocissus chaffanjonii (H.Lév.) Rehder
24. Ampelocissus changensis Craib
25. Ampelocissus cinnamomea (Wall.) Planch.
26. Ampelocissus complanata Latiff
27. Ampelocissus concinna (Baker) Planch.
28. Ampelocissus debilis Ridl.
29. Ampelocissus dekindtiana Gilg
30. Ampelocissus dichrothrix (Miq.) Suess.
31. Ampelocissus dissecta (Baker) Planch.
32. Ampelocissus divaricata (Wall. ex M.A.Lawson) Planch.
33. Ampelocissus dolichobotrys Quisumb. & Merr.
34. Ampelocissus edulis (De Wild.) Gilg & M.Brandt
35. Ampelocissus elegans Gagnep.
36. Ampelocissus elephantina Planch.
37. Ampelocissus erdvendbergiana Planch.
38. Ampelocissus filipes Planch.
39. Ampelocissus floccosa (Ridl.) Galet
40. Ampelocissus frutescens Jackes
41. Ampelocissus gardineri (F.M.Bailey) Jackes
42. Ampelocissus gracilipes Stapf
43. Ampelocissus gracilis (Wall.) Planch.
44. Ampelocissus harmandii Planch.
45. Ampelocissus helferi (M.A.Lawson) Planch.
46. Ampelocissus hoabinhensis C.L.Li
47. Ampelocissus humulifolia Gagnep.
48. Ampelocissus imperialis (Miq.) Planch.
49. Ampelocissus indica (L.) Planch.
50. Ampelocissus iomalla Gilg & M.Brandt
51. Ampelocissus javalensis (Seem.) W.D.Stevens & A.Pool
52. Ampelocissus korthalsii Planch.
53. Ampelocissus latifolia (Roxb.) Planch.
54. Ampelocissus leonensis (Hook.f.) Planch.
55. Ampelocissus leptotricha Diels
56. Ampelocissus lowii (Hook.f.) Planch.
57. Ampelocissus macrocirrha Gilg & M.Brandt
58. Ampelocissus madulidii Latiff
59. Ampelocissus martini Planch.
60. Ampelocissus mesoamericana Lombardi
61. Ampelocissus mottleyi (Hook.f.) Planch.
62. Ampelocissus muelleriana Planch.
63. Ampelocissus multifoliola Merr.
64. Ampelocissus multiloba Gilg & M.Brandt
65. Ampelocissus multistriata (Baker) Planch.
66. Ampelocissus nitida (M.A.Lawson) Planch.
67. Ampelocissus obtusata (Welw. ex Baker) Planch.
68. Ampelocissus ochracea (Teijsm. & Binn.) Merr.
69. Ampelocissus pauciflora Merr.
70. Ampelocissus pedicellata Merr.
71. Ampelocissus phoenicantha Alston
72. Ampelocissus poggei Gilg & M.Brandt
73. Ampelocissus polystachya (Wall. ex M.A.Lawson) Planch.
74. Ampelocissus polythyrsa (Miq.) Gagnep.
75. Ampelocissus pterisanthella (Ridl.) Merr.
76. Ampelocissus racemifera (Jack) Planch.
77. Ampelocissus robinsonii Planch.
78. Ampelocissus rubiginosa Lauterb.
79. Ampelocissus rubriflora Gagnep.
80. Ampelocissus rugosa (Wall.) Planch.
81. Ampelocissus sapinii (De Wild.) Gilg & M.Brandt
82. Ampelocissus sarcocephala (Schweinf. ex Oliv.) Planch.
83. Ampelocissus schimperiana (Hochst. ex A.Rich.) Planch.
84. Ampelocissus sikkimensis (M.A.Lawson) Planch.
85. † Ampelocissus similkameenensis Cevallos-Ferriz & Stockey, 1990
86. Ampelocissus spicifer (Griff.) Planch.
87. Ampelocissus tenuis Merr.
88. Ampelocissus thyrsiflora (Blume) Planch.
89. Ampelocissus tomentosa (Roth) Planch.
90. Ampelocissus trichoclada Quisumb. & Merr.
91. Ampelocissus verschuerenii De Wild.
92. Ampelocissus wightiana B.V.Shetty & Par.Singh
93. Ampelocissus winkleri Lauterb.
94. Ampelocissus xizangensis C.L.Li

== Gallery ==
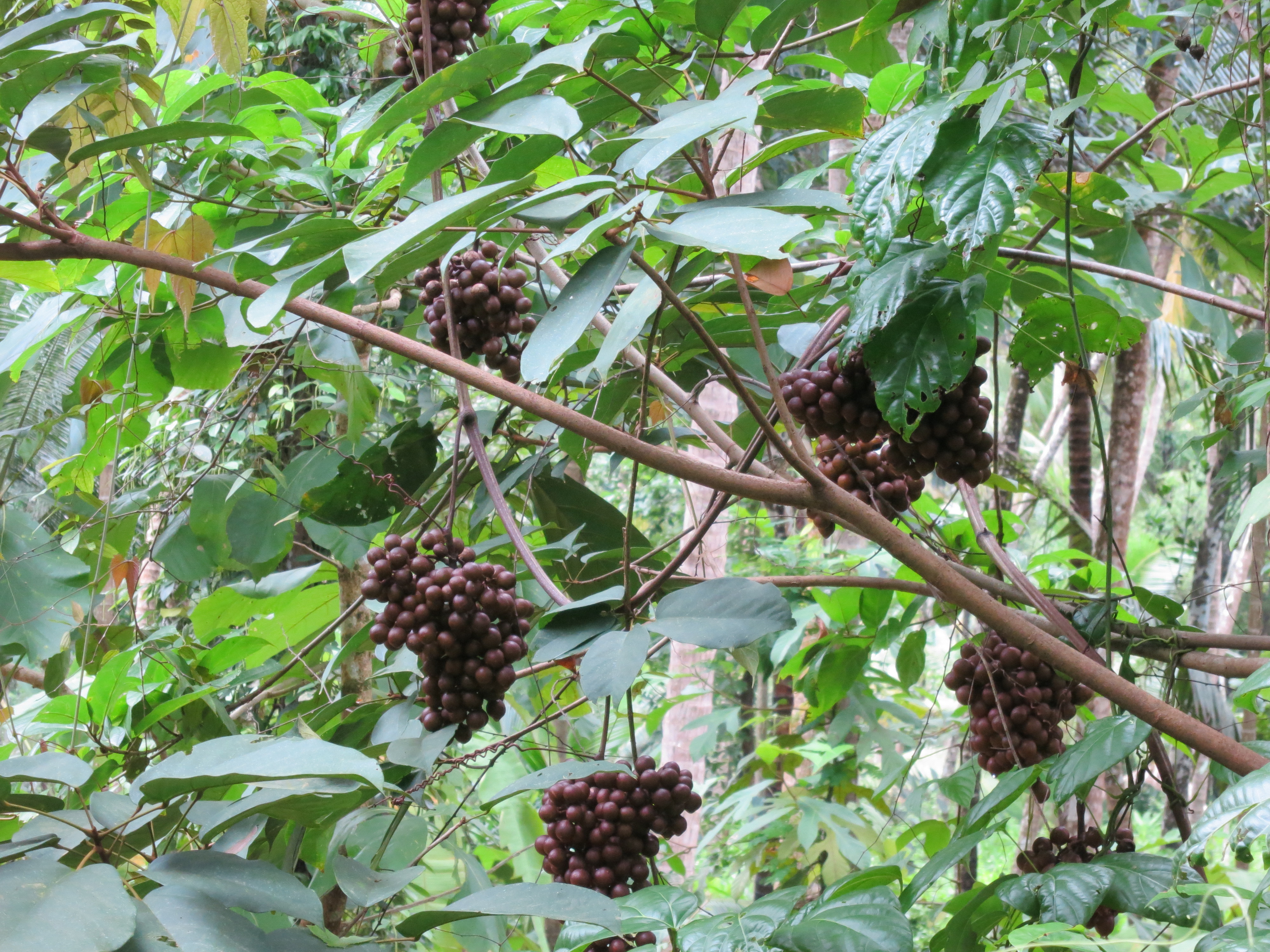
Branch with grape bounches

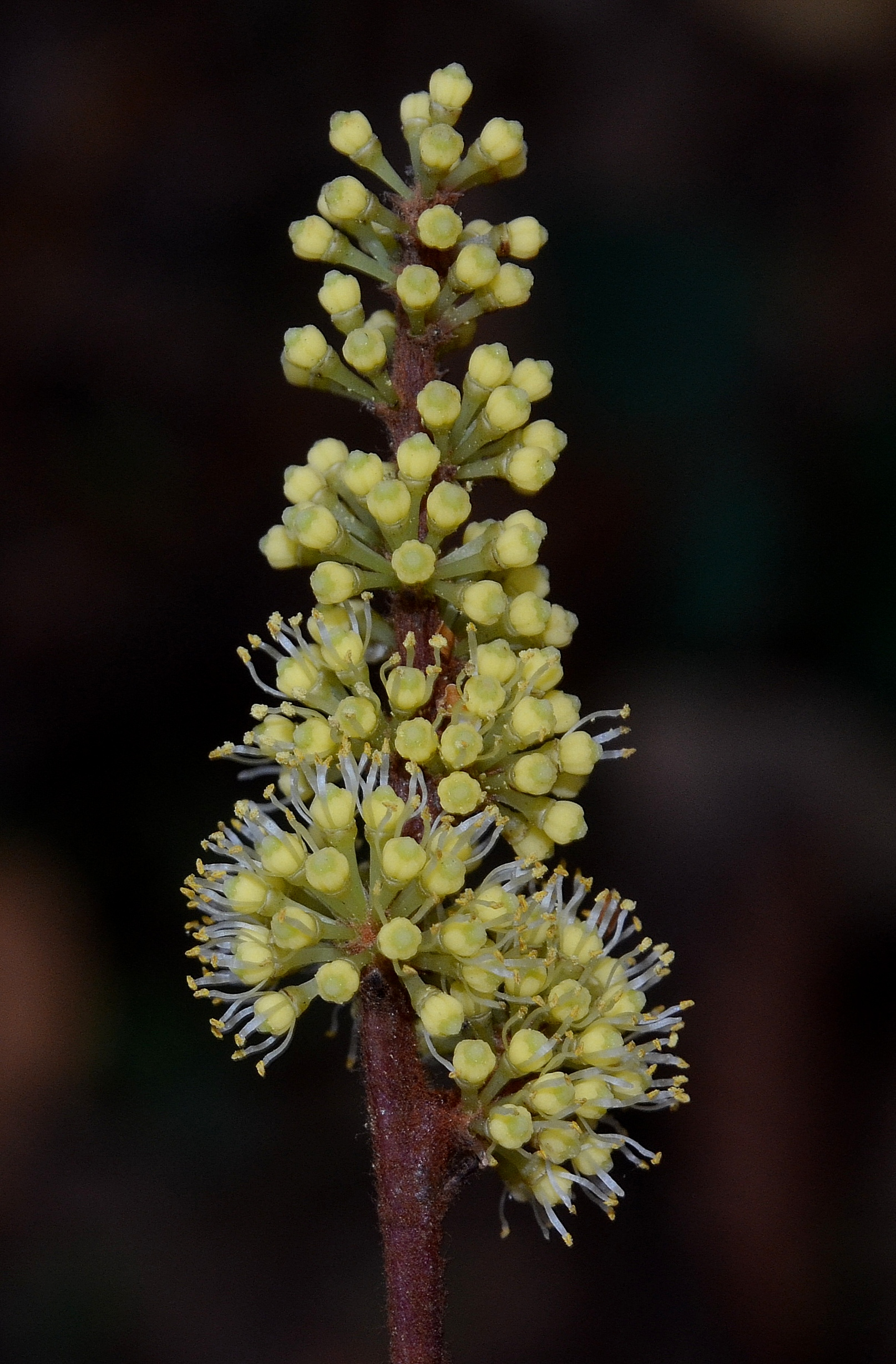
Inflorescence

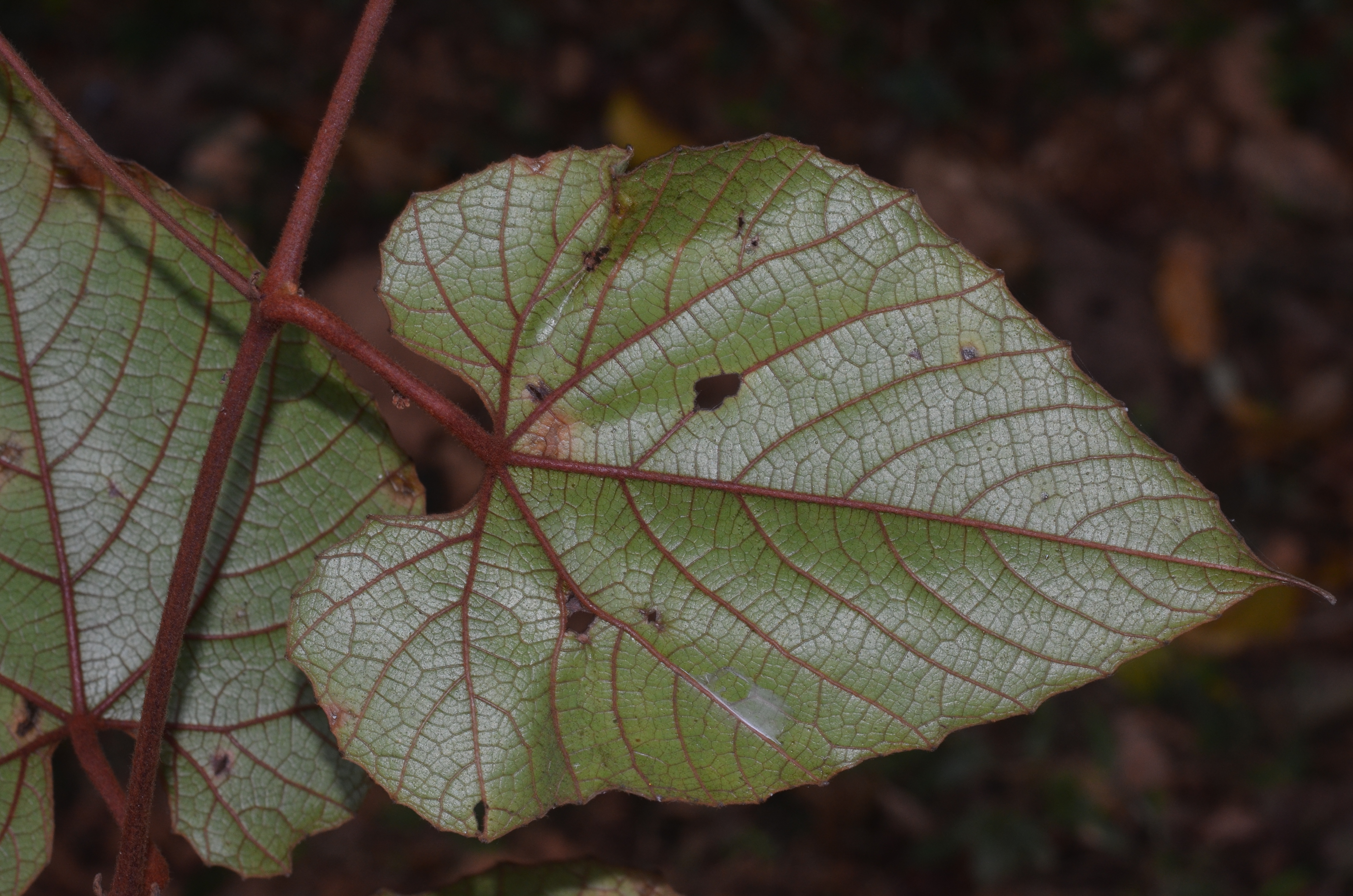
Underside of leaves

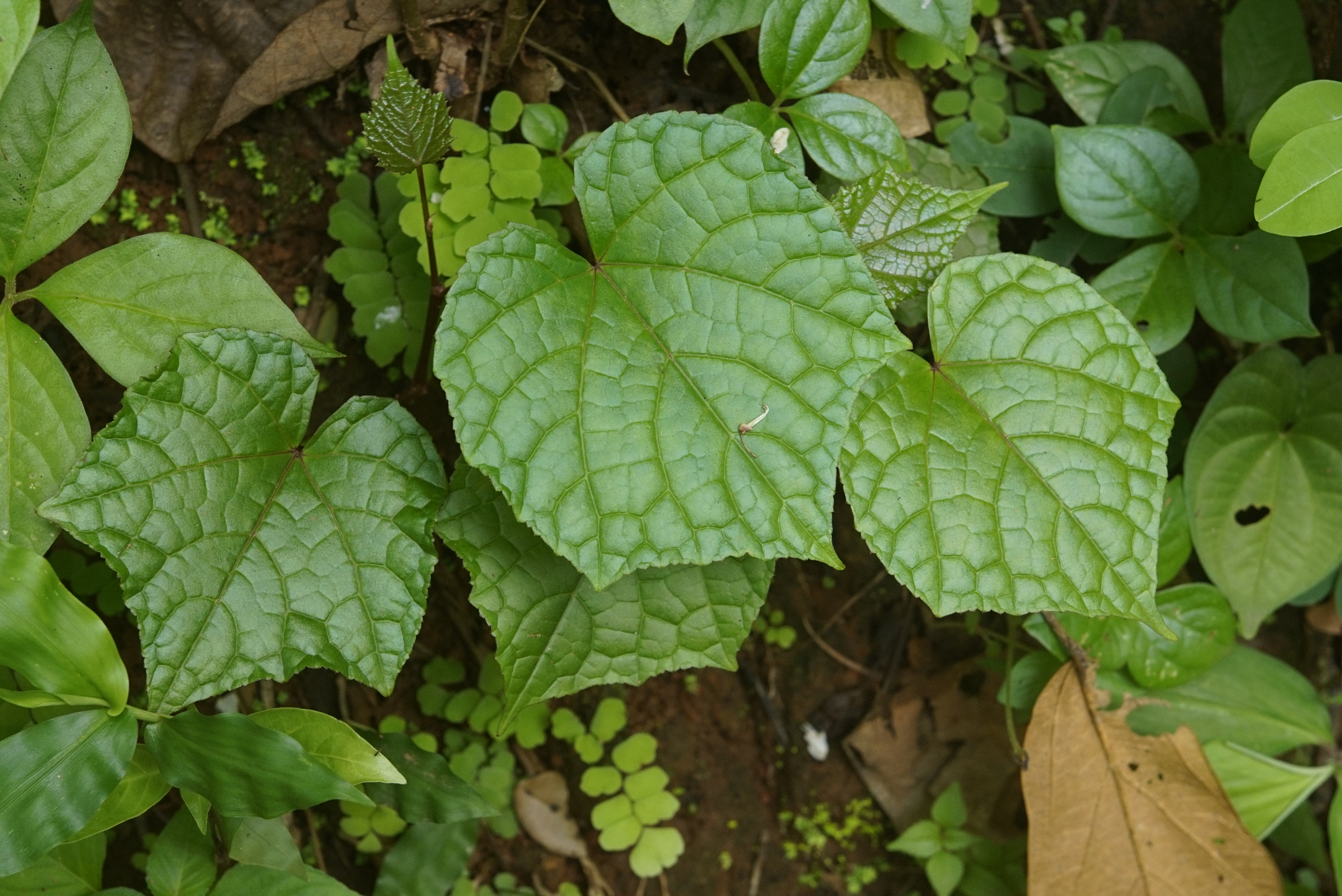
A young plant

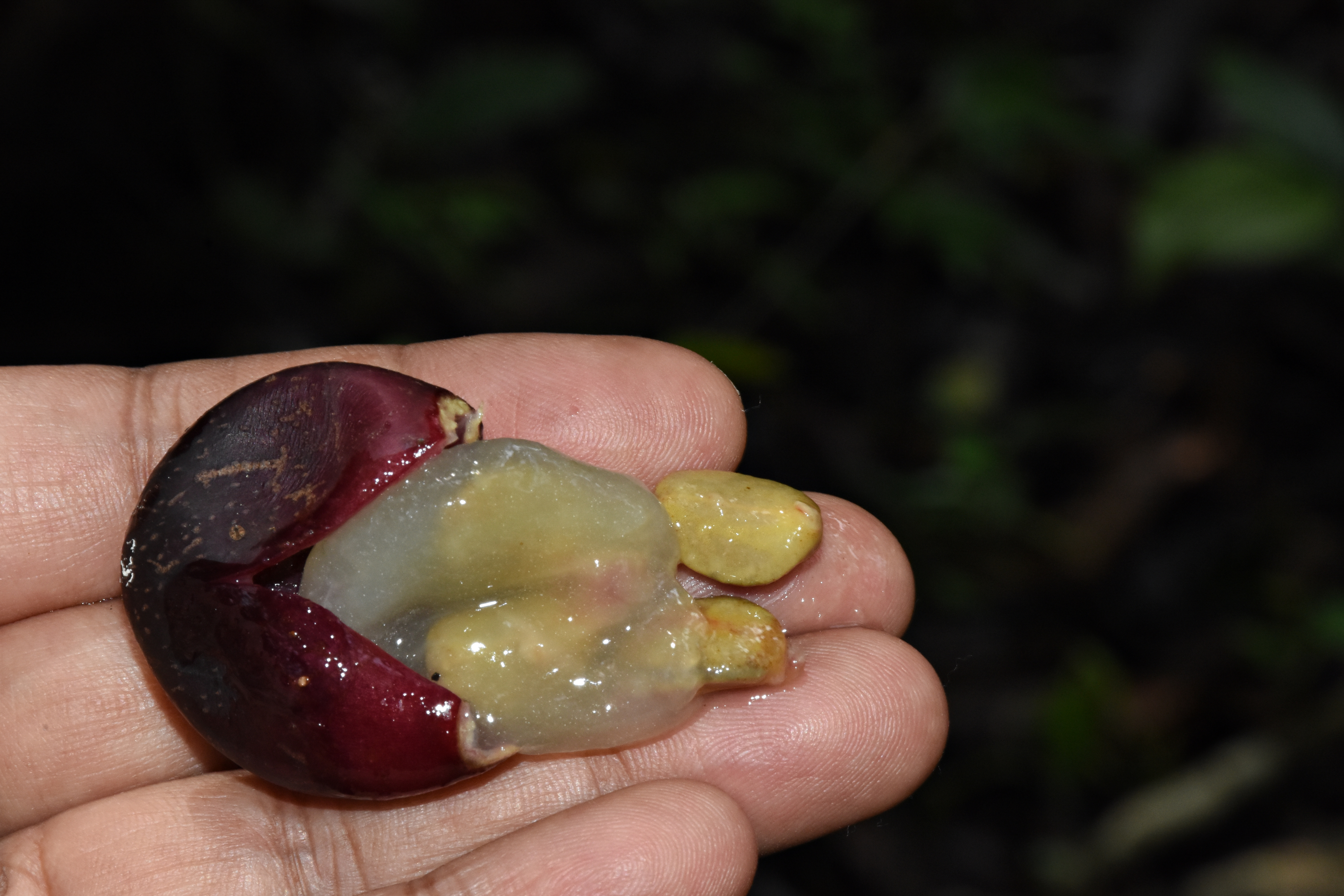
Ripe fruit

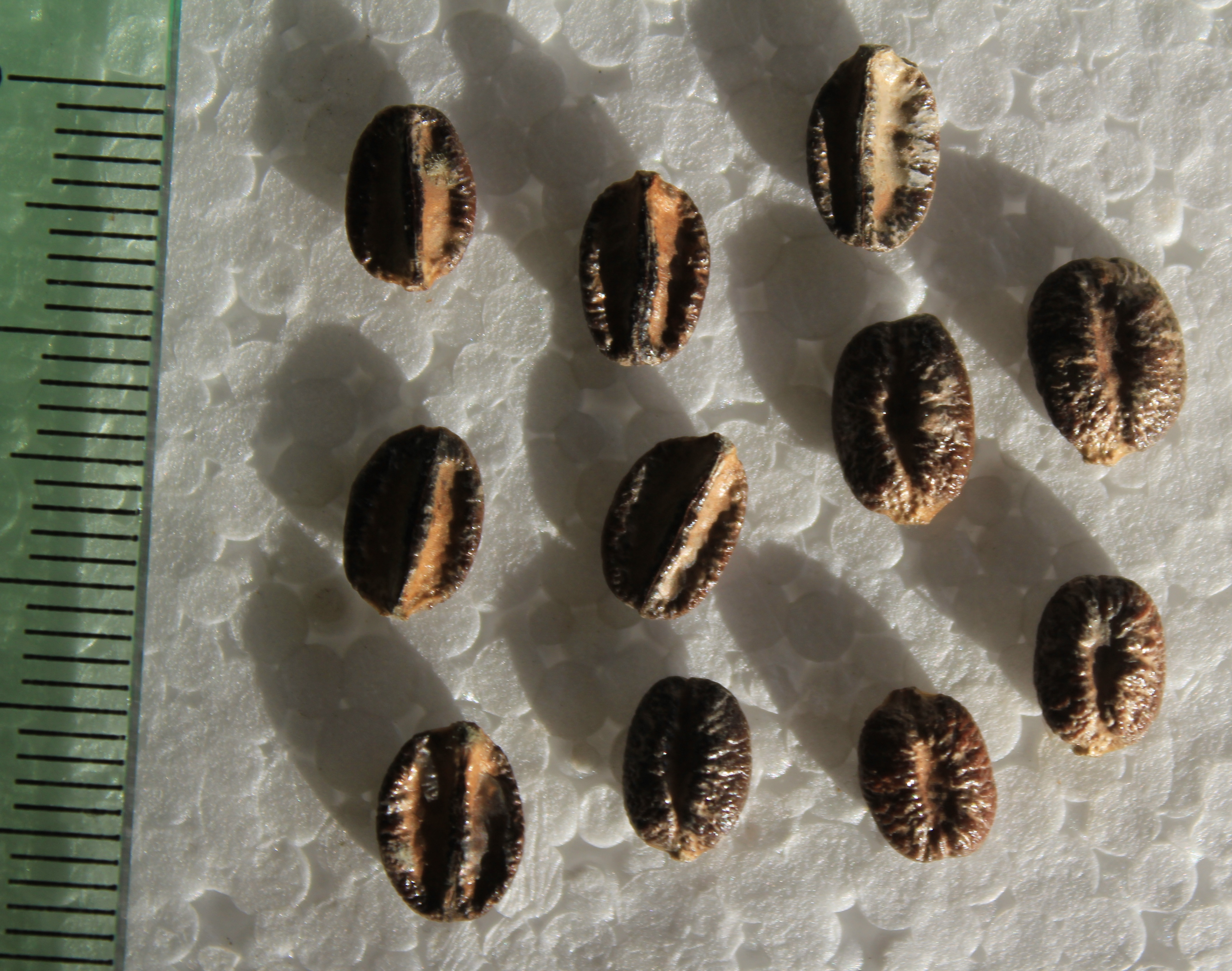
Seeds
