= Ampelocissus winkleri =

Scientific classification
- Kingdom: Plantae
- Clade: Tracheophytes
- Clade: Angiosperms
- Clade: Eudicots
- Clade: Rosids
- Order: Vitales
- Family: Vitaceae
- Genus: Ampelocissus
- Species: A. winkleri

Binomial name
- Ampelocissus winkleri Lauterb.

Species of grapevine

Ampelocissus winkleri is a woody climbing vine, or liana in the grape family Vitaceae native to the island of Borneo. It was described botanically in 1910.
