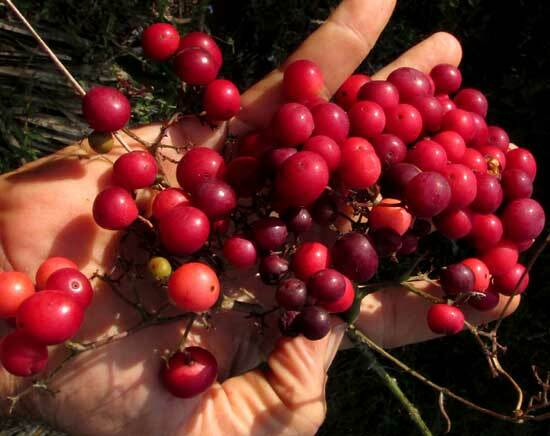
- Ampelocissus erdvendbergiana cluster of immature fruits

Scientific classification
- Kingdom: Plantae
- Clade: Tracheophytes
- Clade: Angiosperms
- Clade: Eudicots
- Clade: Rosids
- Order: Vitales
- Family: Vitaceae
- Genus: Ampelocissus
- Species: A. erdvendbergiana

Binomial name
- Ampelocissus erdvendbergiana Planch. 1885

Synonyms
- Cissus erdvendbergiana (Planch.) Planch. (1887); Ampelocissus erdwendbergii Planch. (1887)

= Ampelocissus erdvendbergiana =

Species of plant

Ampelocissus erdvendbergiana, with no commonly accepted English name, is a neotropical species of climbing, woody liana. It belongs to the familyVitaceae.

== Description ==
Ampelocissus erdvendbergiana is distinguished by these features:

- Stems are woody and climb several meters (yards) high.
- Tendrils branch into nearly equal-size branches; they're "dichotomously branched".
- Leaves are more or less heart-shaped, with irregularly toothed margins, older ones commonly 3-5 lobed but younger ones are unlobed. Blades are on petioles up to 6.5 cm (2.6 in) long, and the blades themselves are up to 13 cm (5.1 in) long, and a little less wide; they bear somewhat cobwebby, white to rusty-colored, branched and unbranched, hairlike trichomes, with no glands among them, and are paler on the undersurface.
- Inflorescences are panicles up to about 20 cm (7.9 in) long and 33 cm (13 in) wide, though usually smaller; they are on peduncles up to 9 cm (3.5 in) long.
- Flowers are quite small and, except for the anthers, red.
- Individual plants appear to bear strictly male flowers as well as flowers developing both fertile male and female parts; they're andromonoecious.
- Berry-type fruits are up to 8 mm (0.31 in) long and a little broader. When mature they are purple, and sometimes seedless.

The very similar Ampelocissus acapulcensis differs from Ampelocissus erdvendbergiana with its inflorescences having shorter side branches, flowers with hairless pedicels and the fruits being larger. Without flowers or fruits the two species are hardly distinguishable, except for the broader, triangular stipules of Ampelocissus erdvendbergiana (instead of "lanceolate").

== Distribution ==
Ampelocissus erdvendbergiana occurs in southern Mexico from the states of Tamaulipas and Yucatán on the Gulf slope and Oaxaca on the Pacific side, south into Guatemala and El Salvador.

== Habitat ==
Ampelocissus inhabits dry forests in areas with extended dry seasons, secondary vegetation, and shrubby savannas from near sea level up to 1,600 metres (5,200 ft).

== Taxonomy ==
The original formal description of Ampelocissus erdvendbergiana by Jules Émile Planchon is found on pages 404 and 405 of his 1887 Monographie des Ampélidées Vraies, under the name Ampelocissus erdwendbergiii. The latter name is considered to be an orthographic variation of the name Cissus erdvendbergiana, which Planchon mentions on page 405 of the same publication. Both of these names now are considered to be synonyms of the currently accepted name, Ampelocissus erdvendbergiana, published in 1885, also by Planchon.

=== Phylogeny ===
Molecular phylogenetic analysis using five plastid and two nuclear markers found that not only do species of New World Ampelocissus not form a clade, but also that Ampelocissus erdvendbergiana is sister of the genus Vitis, while other Ampelocissus species are not. This finding prompts Michael Moore and Jun Wen in the Flora of North America treatment of the Vitaceae to remark that "... A. erdvendbergianus needs to be transferred to Vitis.

=== Etymology ===
The genus name Ampelocissus is a New Latin construction based on the Greek ampelos, meaning "vine", and kissos, meaning "ivy", referring to the foliage and climbing habit of the species.

The species name erdvendbergiana honors L. C. Erdvenberg, who collected the type specimen in Mexico, his #365, and seen by Planchon in the herbarium of "Cosson", who presumably was the French botanist Ernest Cosson (1819-1889).

== Gallery ==
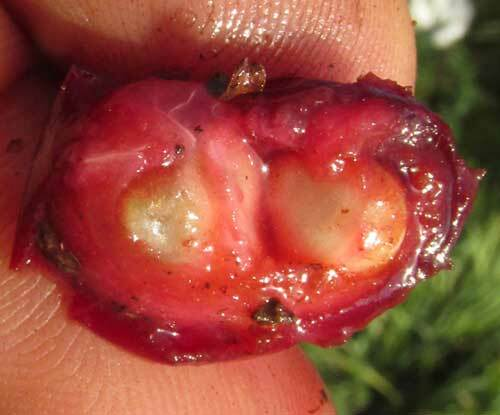
Ampelocissus erdvendbergiana open immature fruit showing seeds

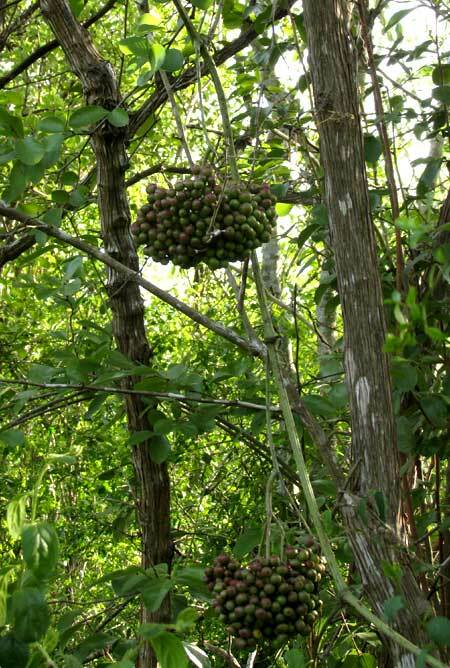
Ampelocissus erdvendbergiana clusters of almost mature fruits

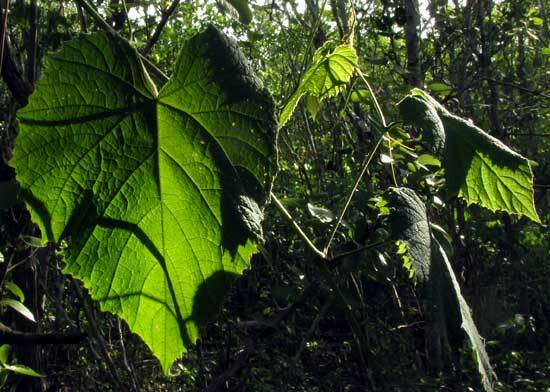
Ampelocissus erdvendbergiana leaves

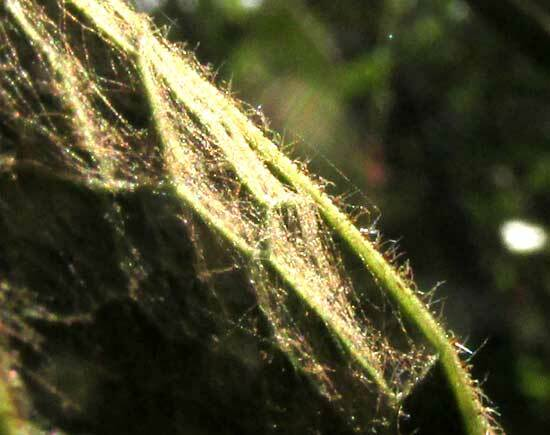
Ampelocissus erdvendbergiana hairy leaf undersurface
