= Ampelocissus barbata =

Scientific classification
- Kingdom: Plantae
- Clade: Tracheophytes
- Clade: Angiosperms
- Clade: Eudicots
- Clade: Rosids
- Order: Vitales
- Family: Vitaceae
- Genus: Ampelocissus
- Species: A. barbata

Binomial name
- Ampelocissus barbata (Wall.) Planch.

Species of grapevine

Ampelocissus barbata is a species of liana in the grape family Vitaceae. It was originally described from Sylhet (now in Bangladesh) by Nathaniel Wallich and placed in the genus Vitis. The species was moved to Ampelocissus by Jules Émile Planchon in 1884.
