= Ampelocissus ascendiflora =

Scientific classification
- Kingdom: Plantae
- Clade: Tracheophytes
- Clade: Angiosperms
- Clade: Eudicots
- Clade: Rosids
- Order: Vitales
- Family: Vitaceae
- Genus: Ampelocissus
- Species: A. ascendiflora

Binomial name
- Ampelocissus ascendiflora Latiff

Species of vine

Ampelocissus ascendiflora is a herbaceous climber with a longitudinally ridged stem, up to 3 mm across, often white tomentose when young, turning brown when older. The tendrils are simple and each has a prominent, ovate bract, similar to the stipules. The leaf is white-tomentose when young, turning brown below and sparsely hairy above when older. The leaf blade is ovate, 4.5–18.0 × 5.5–14 cm, and petiole 4.5–16.0 cm long. The inflorescence is a panicle of spikes, 13–21 cm long. The flower has red petals and a yellow disc. The berry is about 8 mm across with 2 seeds about 7 × 6 mm. It is only known from the Malay Peninsula and Singapore.

== Uses ==
The fruit of A. ascendiflora can be used in chinese herbs. It is dried and milled into powder capsules. The medicine can slowly lower the blood sugar levels. It works by decreasing the liver's production of glucose.
