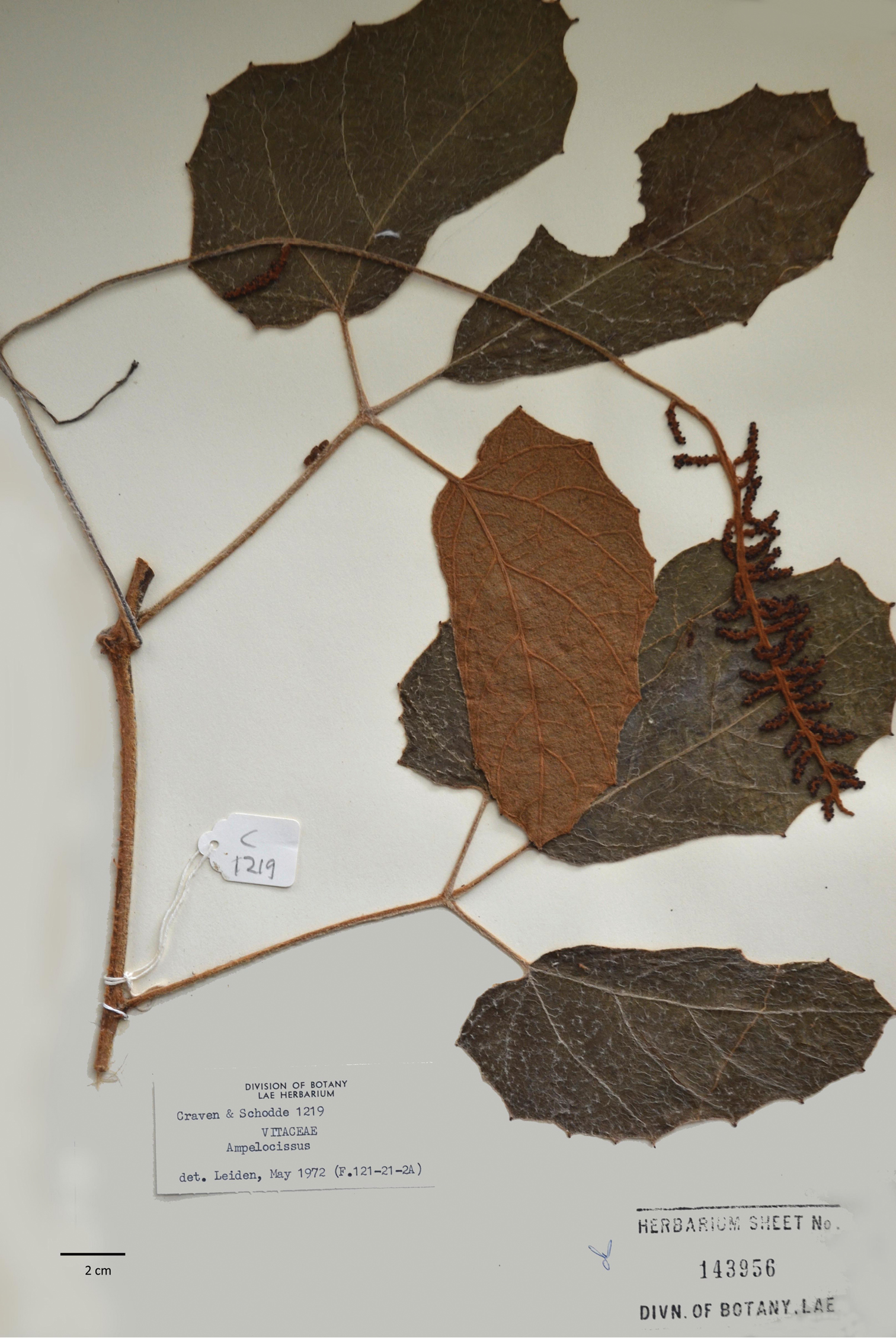
- Ampelocissus asekii holotype
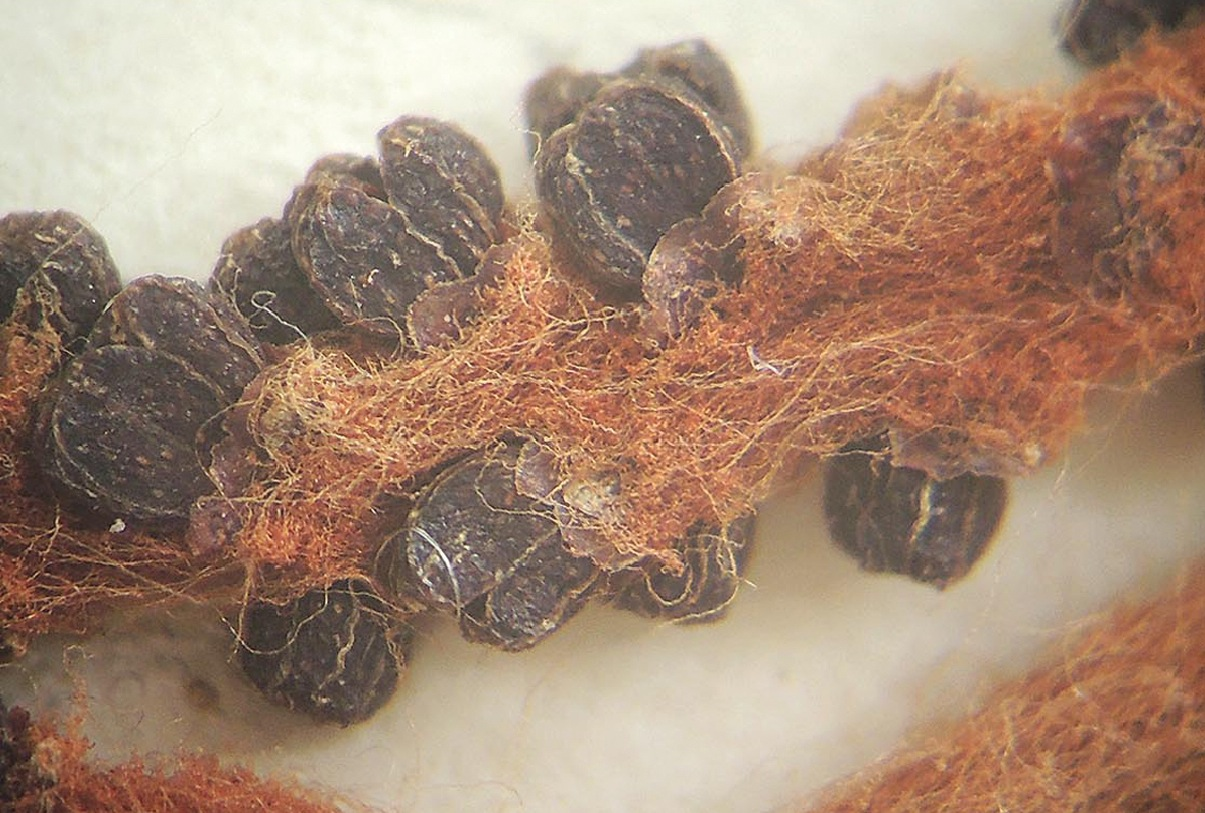
- A. asekii inflorescence

Scientific classification
- Kingdom: Plantae
- Clade: Tracheophytes
- Clade: Angiosperms
- Clade: Eudicots
- Clade: Rosids
- Order: Vitales
- Family: Vitaceae
- Genus: Ampelocissus
- Species: A. asekii

Binomial name
- Ampelocissus asekii J.Wen, Kiapranis & Lovave

= Ampelocissus asekii =

Species of vine

Ampelocissus asekii is a species of vine, in the family Vitaceae, from Morobe Province of Papua New Guinea. It is a close relative of Ampelocissus muelleriana Planch., another endemic of New Guinea and differs from the latter by its densely woolly tomentose lower leaflet surface and much thicker leaflets. The species is from the mid montane forests, whereas A. muelleriana occurs in the lowland rain forests. It is named after the type locality, the Aseki Patrol area in Morobe Province and was first described in 2013.
