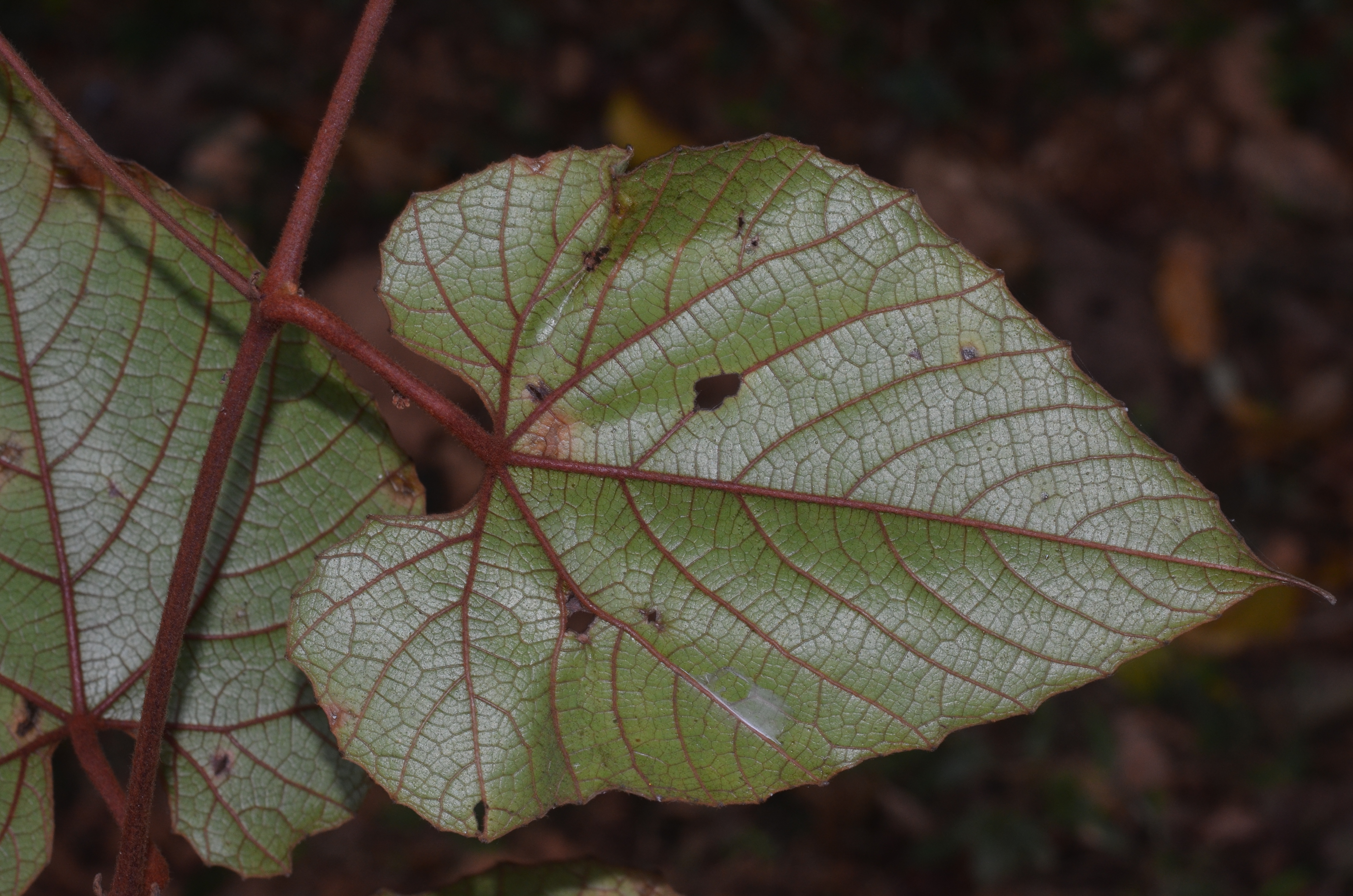

Scientific classification
- Kingdom: Plantae
- Clade: Tracheophytes
- Clade: Angiosperms
- Clade: Eudicots
- Clade: Rosids
- Order: Vitales
- Family: Vitaceae
- Genus: Ampelocissus
- Species: A. indica

Binomial name
- Ampelocissus indica (L.) Planch.

Synonyms
- Cissus indica (L.) Walp.; Vitis indica (L.)

= Ampelocissus indica =

Species of grapevine

Ampelocissus indica is a plant in the Vitoideae subfamily of the grape family native to the India and Sri Lanka.

== Description ==
The plant is a climbing shrub, with tuberous root and reddish stem.

== Uses ==
The root is used for curing various inflammatory skin ailments, swellings, pustules, and carbuncles.
