= Ampelocissus gracilipes =

Abourbee

Scientific classification
- Kingdom: Plantae
- Clade: Tracheophytes
- Clade: Angiosperms
- Clade: Eudicots
- Clade: Rosids
- Order: Vitales
- Family: Vitaceae
- Genus: Ampelocissus
- Species: A. gracilipes

Binomial name
- Ampelocissus gracilipes Stapf

Species of vine

Ampelocissus gracilipes, also known as abourbee (Akan-Twi), is a climbing vine or liana in the Grape family of tropical western Africa (Ghana to Liberia), in densely vegetative, forested areas.

The stems which are semi-woody, thick and sturdy, but not very hard, start out with a dense covering of washy-brown hairs, giving way over time to a complexion of small warts. Both flowers and fruits are red.

== Uses ==
The stem sap is potable and abundant, and can be drunk like water. The fruits, whether they have ripened or not, are also edible, but are not consumed in great quantity.
