= Ampelocissus xizangensis =

Scientific classification
- Kingdom: Plantae
- Clade: Tracheophytes
- Clade: Angiosperms
- Clade: Eudicots
- Clade: Rosids
- Order: Vitales
- Family: Vitaceae
- Genus: Ampelocissus
- Species: A. xizangensis

Binomial name
- Ampelocissus xizangensis C.L.Li

Species of plant

Ampelocissus xizangensis (xi zang suan lian teng in Chinese) is a deciduous vine in the family Vitaceae, native to shrublands in the high valleys of the Tibet Autonomous Region and Nepal, at elevations about 2000 m high.

Its specific epithet is a toponym derived from the place it was collected from, Xizang, which is the Chinese name for the Tibet Autonomous Region. It was first scientifically described in 1997 by the Chinese botanist, Li Chao-Luang.

== Description ==
=== Branches and tendrils ===
The lianas of A. xizangensis are woody. Its climbing branchlets, which are cylindrical and gradually tapering, have longitudinal ridges and sometimes a slight, pale wooliness.

Dividing off from them are characteristically bifurcated tendrils, which appear as twisting cork-screws. These grow towards and slowly grip whatever tall, stationary object they happen upon. This action, called circumnutation, has the real effect of securing and pulling the branches higher, thus enabling its leaves exposure to the sun for photosynthesis. The whole process is repeated continuously throughout the life-cycle of the plant.

=== Foliage ===
The leaves of A. xizangensis are simple. Leaflets are typically between 23 – 24 cm long, broadly ovate, cordate at their bases, rounded and obtuse at their apexes, and finely-toothed on their margins. Each has 5 basal veins, and 4 or 5 pairs of lateral veins. Smaller veins are barely noticeable on the leaf's upper (adaxial) surface, while being slightly prominent on the under (abaxial) side. They are intricately downy with brown tomentum adaxially, and covered in somewhat long and straight, slightly stiff but weak, hairs abaxially. The petiole is about 15 cm long, and only covered sparsely in brownish, arachnoid hairs, which tend to be shed over time.

=== Flowers ===
The flower buds of A. xizangensis emerge elliptic, with a rounded apex, and measure 2 to 2.5 mm in length, blooming in July.

Dichasium inflorescence branching pattern

Inflorescences are leaf-opposed, compound dichasiums (at left). The inflorescence's base branches into two peduncles before terminating in a tendril. The peduncles, which are about 6 cm long, branch into pedicels, and are, like the petioles of the leaves, sparsely matted in arachnoid tomentum; but unlike the petioles, these tend not to be shed.

The pedicel, which is 1-1.5 mm long, wears a sparse coat of glandular hairs. The calyx is nearly hairless, has pendulous lobes and is generally saucer-like in shape. Petals are smooth, ovate-oblong, and measure 1.5-1.8 mm. There are 5 stamens, each topped by an oval anther. The lower portion of the ovary is adnate to the flower's disk, which is lobed and clearly visible. The style is short with ridges, about ten in number.

=== Fruit ===
The fruit of A. xizangensis is a one- to four-seeded, grape-like berry.
