= Ampelocissus elegans =

Scientific classification
- Kingdom: Plantae
- Clade: Tracheophytes
- Clade: Angiosperms
- Clade: Eudicots
- Clade: Rosids
- Order: Vitales
- Family: Vitaceae
- Genus: Ampelocissus
- Species: A. elegans

Binomial name
- Ampelocissus elegans Gagnep.

Synonyms
- Vitis elegans Kurz; Vitis coralloides Hook.f. ex M.A.Lawson

Species of vine

Ampelocissus elegans is a species in the genus Ampelocissus. It is a herbaceous climber with trifoliate leaves.

== Uses ==
The trifoliate leaves of A. elegans are used in cooking and herbs. It used as a spice in cooking. The fruit of A. elegans can be used in Chinese herbs.
