= Ampelocissus abyssinica =

Scientific classification
- Kingdom: Plantae
- Clade: Tracheophytes
- Clade: Angiosperms
- Clade: Eudicots
- Clade: Rosids
- Order: Vitales
- Family: Vitaceae
- Genus: Ampelocissus
- Species: A. abyssinica

Binomial name
- Ampelocissus abyssinica (Hochst. ex A.Rich) Planch.

Synonyms
- Vitis abyssinica Hochst. ex A.Rich. (Poss.); Ampelocissus cavicaulis (Baker) Planch. (Poss.); Cissus pauli-guilielmii Schweinf.(Poss.); Vitis cavicaulis Baker

Species of vine

Ampelocissus abyssinica is a large climbing vine native to southeast Ethiopia, where it is known in the Afaan Oromo language by the name teru (also the name for a part of that country), and is used as a herbal treatment for the medical condition known as black leg. Its first botanical description was in 1847 as Vitis abyssinica, that name being the basionym for its treatment here under the genus Ampelocissus.
