= Teru Hayashi =

American cell biologist

- Born: February 12, 1914; Atlantic City, New Jersey, US
- Died: December 18, 2003 (aged 89); Falmouth, Massachusetts, US
- Other names: Tay Hayashi
- Education: Ursinus College; University of Missouri
- Spouses: Sally Rexon; Sally Browne
- Children: 3 sons, 1 daughter
- Awards: Guggenheim Fellowship (1954)
- Scientific career
- Fields: Cell biology Cell physiology
- Institutions: Columbia University; Marine Biological Laboratory
- Thesis: Dilution medium and survival of the spermatozoa of Arbacia punctulata (1943)
- Doctoral advisor: Daniel Mazia
- Other academic advisors: Albert Szent-Györgyi
- Doctoral students: Richard Strohman

Teru "Tay" Hayashi (February 12, 1914 – December 18, 2003) was a Japanese-American cell biologist and physiologist known for his research on the biochemical mechanisms of muscle contraction.

Hayashi was born in 1914 in Atlantic City, New Jersey, where he was raised by Japanese parents. In 1938, he received a physics degree from Ursinus College in Pennsylvania, followed by a Ph.D. in biology from the University of Missouri in 1943. At the University of Missouri, he studied under the supervision of Daniel Mazia.

Hayashi joined the faculty of Columbia University in 1945, eventually becoming full professor and chairman of the biology department there. In 1967, he left Columbia to join the Illinois Institute of Technology, where he founded and subsequently chaired the biology department. He began working at the Marine Biological Laboratory (MBL) in Woods Hole, Massachusetts as an independent investigator in 1948, and later became one of its corporation members and trustees.

Hayashi was a Guggenheim Fellow in 1954 and a Humboldt Fellow in 1974. He was also a Fulbright Scholar in 1954 and 1974. He was a member of the Society of General Physiologists, the American Association for the Advancement of Science, the Biophysical Society, and the Physiological Society. In 2002, the MBL established the Tay Hayashi Lecture in Cell Physiology in his honor.

Hayashi died of esophageal cancer on December 18, 2003, at the Royal Nursing Center in Falmouth, Massachusetts.
