= Amalda concinna =

Scientific classification
- Kingdom: Animalia
- Phylum: Mollusca
- Class: Gastropoda
- Subclass: Caenogastropoda
- Order: Neogastropoda
- Family: Ancillariidae
- Genus: Amalda
- Species: A. concinna

Binomial name
- Amalda concinna Ninomiya, 1990

Synonyms
- Amalda (Mundaspira) concinna Ninomiya, 1990

Species of gastropod

Amalda concinna is a species of sea snail, a marine gastropod mollusk in the family Ancillariidae.
