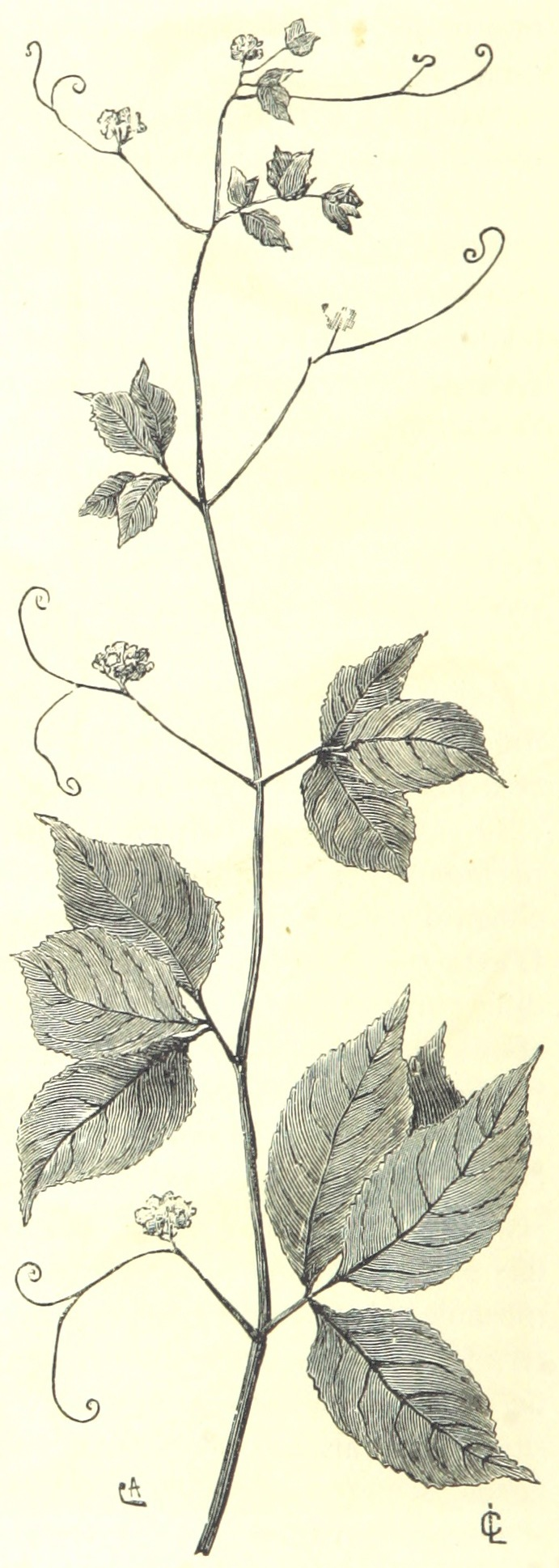

Scientific classification
- Kingdom: Plantae
- Clade: Tracheophytes
- Clade: Angiosperms
- Clade: Eudicots
- Clade: Rosids
- Order: Vitales
- Family: Vitaceae
- Genus: Ampelocissus
- Species: A. concinna

Binomial name
- Ampelocissus concinna (Baker) Planch.

Synonyms
- Vitis concinna Baker

= Ampelocissus concinna =

Species of plant

Ampelocissus concinna is a species of flowering plant in the Vitaceae family. It is a climbing vine or liana in the grape family native to Angola.
