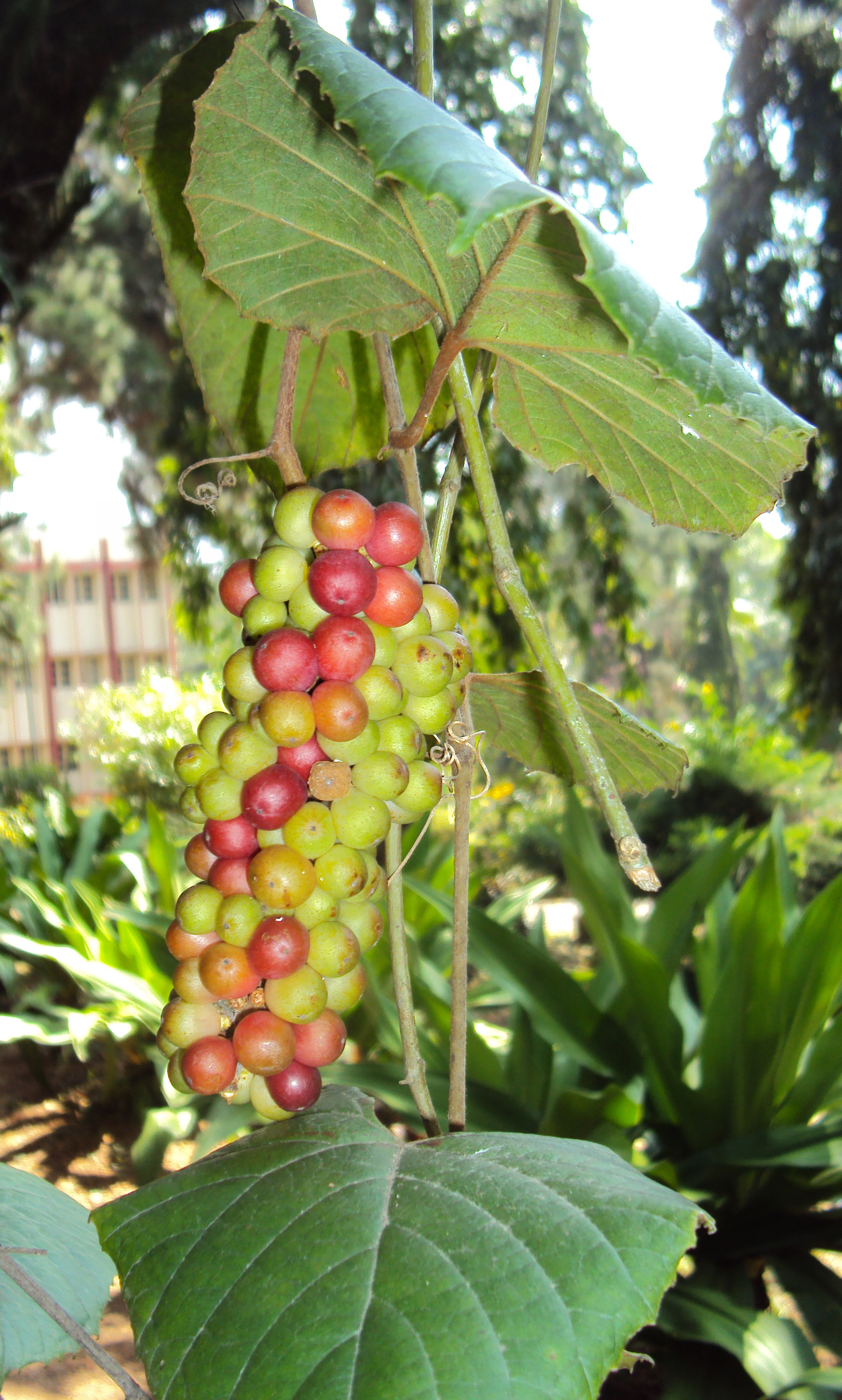

Scientific classification
- Kingdom: Plantae
- Clade: Tracheophytes
- Clade: Angiosperms
- Clade: Eudicots
- Clade: Rosids
- Order: Vitales
- Family: Vitaceae
- Genus: Ampelocissus
- Species: A. latifolia

Binomial name
- Ampelocissus latifolia (Roxb.) Planch.

Synonyms
- Vitis latifolia Roxb.

= Ampelocissus latifolia =

Species of grapevine

Ampelocissus latifolia is a plant in the Vitoideae subfamily of the grape family native to the Indian subcontinent, including Bangladesh, India, Nepal, and Pakistan.

It is the type species for the genus of Ampelocissus and was initially treated under its basionym, Vitis latifolia, which was described scientifically in 1824. In 1884, Jules Émile Planchon reclassified the species under the genus Ampelocissus.
