= Ampelocissus africana =

Conservation status
- Least Concern (IUCN 3.1)

Scientific classification
- Kingdom: Plantae
- Clade: Tracheophytes
- Clade: Angiosperms
- Clade: Eudicots
- Clade: Rosids
- Order: Vitales
- Family: Vitaceae
- Genus: Ampelocissus
- Species: A. africana

Binomial name
- Ampelocissus africana (Lour.) Merr.

Synonyms
- Ampelopsis africana (Lour.) Steud.; Ampelopsis botria DC.; Botria africana Lour. in Fl. Cochinch.: 154 (1790); Cissus botria Peterm. in Pflanzenreich: 636 (1845), nom. superfl.; Vitis africara (Lour.) Spreng.

Species of plant

Ampelocissus africana is a species of flowering plant in the grape family, Vitaceae. It is a type of woody vine or liana that bears edible fruit. It was originally described botanically in 1790 by João de Loureiro as Botria africanus, which is the basionym for its treatment here under Ampelocissus.

== Distribution ==
It is native Benin, Botswana, Burkina Faso, Burundi, Cameroon, the Caprivi Strip, the Central African Republic, Chad, the Democratic Republic of the Congo, Guinea, Guinea-Bissau, Ivory Coast, Kenya, Liberia, Malawi, Mali, Mozambique, Niger, Nigeria, Rwanda, Senegal, Somalia, Sudan, Tanzania (including the Zanzibar Archipelago, from where the type specimen was collected), Uganda, Zambia, and Zimbabwe.
