= Ana Clavel =

Mexican writer

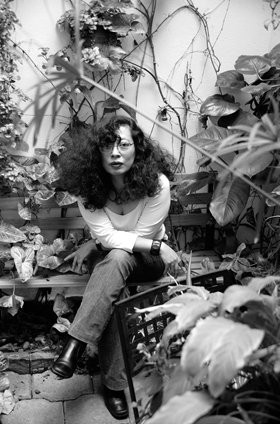
- Ana Clavel
- Born: December 16, 1961 (age 63); Mexico City, Mexico

Ana V. Clavel (born December 16, 1961, in Mexico City) is a Mexican writer. She received a bachelor's degree in Hispanic Language and Literature and master's in Latin American Literature from the National Autonomous University of Mexico (UNAM).

Her more recent novels have incorporated multimedia elements, such as art and photography installations and video performance.

== Awards and honors ==
Awards for Clavel's writing
Year	Title	Award	Result	Ref.
1983	En un rincón del infierno	CREA National Short Story Award	Winner	
1983	Tu bella boca rojo carmesí	UNAM Great Ideas Story Contest	Winner	
1991	Cuando María mira el mar	Gilberto Owen National Literature Prize	Winner	
1999	Los deseos y su sombra	Alfaguara International Novel Award	Finalist	
2004		Sociéte Académique “Arts-Scienses-Lettres”	Silver	
2005	Las violetas son flores del deseo	Juan Rulfo Short Novel Award (Prix Juan Rulfo)	Winner	
2013	Las ninfas a veces sonríen	Elena Poniatowska Ibero-American Novel Prize	Winner	

== Publications ==
=== Novels ===
- Los deseos y su sombra (in Spanish). 1999.
- Las Violetas son flores del deseo (in Spanish). Alfaguara. 2002. ISBN 9789705800535.
- Cuerpo náufrago (in Spanish). Alfaguara. 2005. ISBN 9789707702318.
- El dibujante de sombras (in Spanish). Alfaguara. 2010. ISBN 9786071103000.
- Nochebuena en tu cuerpo (in Spanish). Tusquets Editores. 2011. ISBN 9786074212976.
- Las ninfas a veces sonríen (in Spanish). Alfaguara. 2013. ISBN 9786071123428.
- El amor es hambre (in Spanish). Alfaguara. 2015. ISBN 9786073131254.
- Por desobedecer a sus padres. Alfaguara. 2022. ISBN 9786073821872.

=== Anthology contributions ===
- Mayo, Eduardo Jiménez; Brown, Chris N., eds. (2012). "Three Messages and a Warning in the Same Email". Three Messages and a Warning: Contemporary Mexican Short Stories of the Fantastic. Small Beer Press. ISBN 9781931520317.
- Anuncios clasificados (in Spanish). Ediciones Cal y Arena. 2013. ISBN 9786077638872.

=== Short story collections ===
- Fuera de escena. 1984. ISBN 9682902320.
- Amorosos de atar (in Spanish). 1992. ISBN 9789686608113.
- Amor y otros suicidios. Ediciones B. 2012. ISBN 9786074802955.
