= Teru Clavel =

American author and education consultant

- Education: Dartmouth College and Drexel University
- Occupations: Writer and Education Consultant
- Board member of: Japan Times Media Advisory Board

Teru Clavel is an American author and education consultant.

== Early life ==
Teru Clavel was born to a mother of Japanese descent and an American father. She later earned her undergraduate degree from Dartmouth College, and her MS in Comparative International Education from Drexel University.

== Career ==
Teru Clavel began investigating and evaluating "elite" grade schools after experiencing the process of getting her own child into these kinds of schools in New York City. Before she had to decide whether to invest in the process, she moved to Hong Kong in 2006, and spent the following decade raising her children in Asia instead (they moved to Shanghai in 2010, and Tokyo in 2012). After the move, she began researching the education systems of several countries. She returned to the US in 2016, living in Palo Alto, and then returning to New York City in 2018. Through this period she has worked as both an educational consultant and columnist. She has also been a member of the Japan Times Media Advisory Board.

== Books ==
In 2019 Clavel released her book World Class: One Mother’s Journey Halfway Around the Globe in Search of the Best Education for Her Children.
