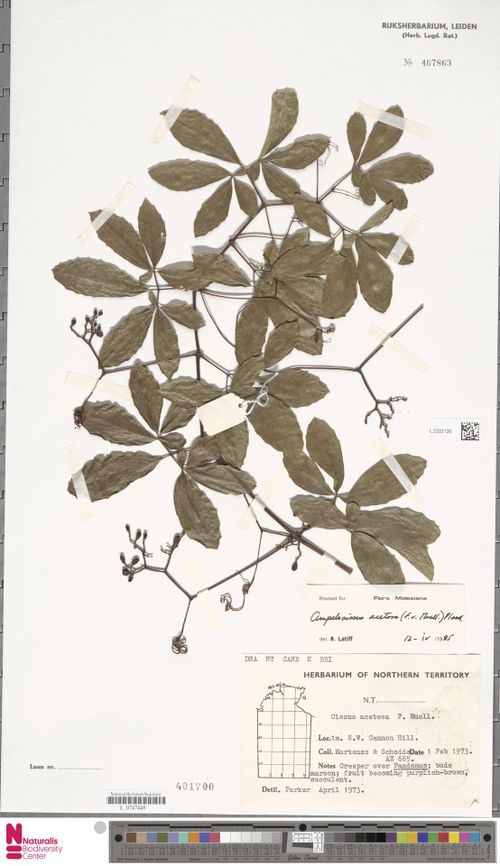
- specimen L.2332136 from Naturalis Biodiversity Center

Scientific classification
- Kingdom: Plantae
- Clade: Tracheophytes
- Clade: Angiosperms
- Clade: Eudicots
- Clade: Rosids
- Order: Vitales
- Family: Vitaceae
- Genus: Ampelocissus
- Species: A. acetosa

Binomial name
- Ampelocissus acetosa (F.Muell.) Planch.

Synonyms
- Cissus acetosa F.Muell. Cayratia acetosa (F. Muell.) Domin; Vitis acetosa (F.Muell.) F.Muell.

= Ampelocissus acetosa =

Species of vine

Ampelocissus acetosa is a species of vine. Common names include wild grape and djabaru.

It is native to New Guinea as well as tropical parts of Western Australia, the Northern Territory and Queensland in Australia.
