= Longzhou (disambiguation) =

Longzhou (pinyin) or Lung-chou (Wade–Giles) are atonal romanizations of various Chinese names and words.

They primarily refer to Longzhou County (龍州縣, Longzhou xian), Guangxi Zhuang Autonomous Region, People's Republic of China.

Longzhou may also refer to:

- Longzhou Town (龍州鎮, Longzhou zhen) in Guangxi, a town in that county
- Longzhou Grape, grown in that county
- Longzhou Zhuang language, a dialect of Zhuang spoken around the county
- Longzhou Town (龍州鎮, Longzhou zhen) in Hebei
- Dragon boat (龙舟), a kind of oarred Chinese racing vessel
