= Vitis × doaniana =

Scientific classification
- Kingdom: Plantae
- Clade: Tracheophytes
- Clade: Angiosperms
- Clade: Eudicots
- Clade: Rosids
- Order: Vitales
- Family: Vitaceae
- Genus: Vitis
- Species: V. × doaniana

Binomial name
- Vitis × doaniana Munson

Variety of grape

Vitis × doaniana (Doan's grape) is a hybrid grape resulting from the natural hybridization of Vitis mustangensis with Vitis acerifolia. Its native range is the U.S. states of Oklahoma, Colorado, Texas, and New Mexico.
