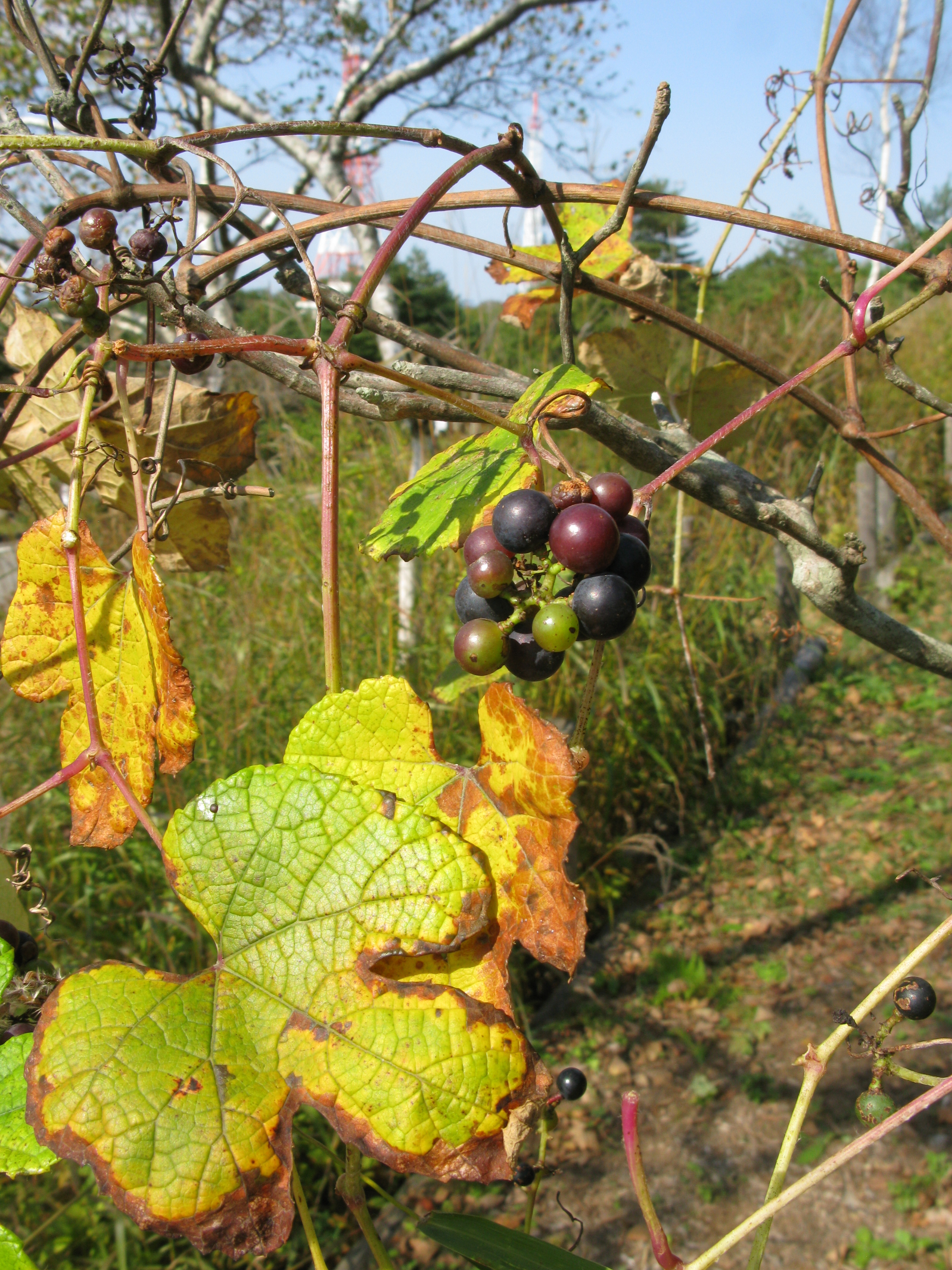
- Vitis ficifolia, Aizu area, Fukushima pref., Japan

Scientific classification
- Kingdom: Plantae
- Clade: Embryophytes
- Clade: Tracheophytes
- Clade: Spermatophytes
- Clade: Angiosperms
- Clade: Eudicots
- Clade: Rosids
- Order: Vitales
- Family: Vitaceae
- Genus: Vitis
- Species: V. heyneana

Binomial name
- Vitis heyneana Roemer & Schult.

Subspecies
- V. h. subsp. heyneana (autonym); V. h. subsp. ficifolia (Bunge) C.L.Li

= Vitis heyneana =

Species of grapevine

Vitis heyneana is a species of climbing vine in the grape family endemic to Asia. It can be found in shrubby or forested areas, from almost sea-level, to 3200 meters above. It has globose berries (10–13 mm diam.) that are purple to almost black.

== Subspecies ==
Vitis heyneana is known by its two subspecies: V. h. subsp. heyneana (autonym), and V. h. subsp. ficifolia. In Chinese, the former is called mao pu tao, meaning wool grape; it has leaves that range in shape from oval, ovate-oblong, to ovate-quinquangular. The latter subspecies is called sang ye pu tao, or mulberry-leaf grape, and its leaves are usually trilobate to cleft (a few leaves interspersed on a vine will be undivided). However, V. h. subsp. ficifolia may be a homotypic synonym of Vitis ficifolia Bunge, as the same type was used for both.

Other notable differences exist as well:

=== Respective ranges and altitude tolerance ===
V. heyneana subsp. ficifolia shares territory with V. h. subsp. heyneana in the Chinese provinces of Henan, Shaanxi, Shandong, and Shanxi; and it alone occupies Hebei and Jiangsu; but of the two subspecies, V. h. subsp. heyneana has by far the wider range; in addition to those already mentioned, V. h. subsp. heyneana is found in the provinces of Anhui, Chongqing, Fujian, Gansu, Guangdong, Guangxi, Guizhou, Hubei, Hunan, Jiangxi, Sichuan, Xizang, Yunnan, and Zhejiang), as well as the countries India, Bhutan, and Nepal.

The success of V. h. subsp. heyneana in multiplying itself in so many places, in contrast to the relatively limited range V. h. subsp. ficifolia correlates similarly with how well it manages to survive at higher altitudes

- V. h. subsp. heyneana : 100–3200 meters above sea-level
- V. h. subsp. ficifolia : 100–1300 meters above sea-level

=== Respective times of bloom and fruition ===
Comparing the two, V. h. subsp. heyneana has periods of bloom and fruiting longer than those of V. h. subsp. ficifolia —

Flowering months :

- V. h. subsp. heyneana : April – June or July
- V. h. subsp. ficifolia : May – July

Fruiting months :

- V. h. subsp. heyneana : June – October
- V. h. subsp. ficifolia : July – September
