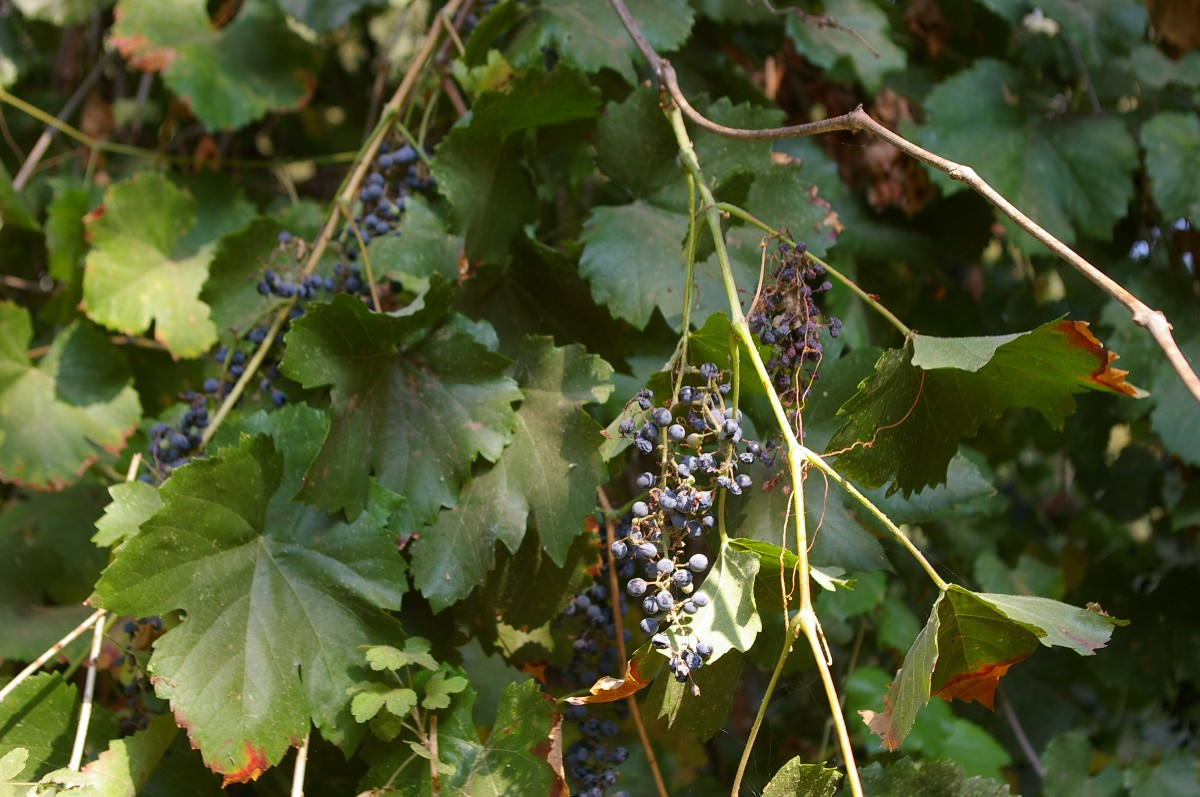
- Vitis californica with fruit

Scientific classification
- Kingdom: Plantae
- Clade: Tracheophytes
- Clade: Angiosperms
- Clade: Eudicots
- Clade: Rosids
- Order: Vitales
- Family: Vitaceae
- Subfamily: Vitoideae
- Genus: Vitis; L.

Type species
- Vitis vinifera L.

Species
- See text

Synonyms
- 22 synonyms: Allosampela Raf.; Ampelovitis Carrière; Berberina Bronner; Dionysia Bronner; Dioscoridea Bronner; Elisabetha Bronner; Gockia Bronner; Gonoloma Raf.; Heddaea Bronner; Hlubeckia Bronner; Leonhardia Bronner; Ludovica Bronner; Maerklinia Bronner; Muscadinia Small; Noachia Bronner; Palatina Bronner; Schamsia Bronner; Sickleria Bronner; Spinovitis Rom.Caill.; Thalesia Bronner; Tyrtamia Bronner; Zaehringia Bronner

= Vitis =

Vitis Temporal range: 66–0 Ma Cretaceous- Recent

Genus of flowering plants in the grape family

Vitis (grapevine) is a genus of about 80 species of twining plants in the family Vitaceae. The genus consists of species predominantly from the Northern Hemisphere. It is economically important as the source of grapes, both for direct consumption of the fruit and for fermentation to produce wine. The study and cultivation of grapevines is called viticulture.

Most cultivated Vitis varieties are wind-pollinated with hermaphroditic flowers containing both male and female reproductive structures, while wild species are dioecious. These flowers are grouped in bunches called inflorescences. In many species, such as Vitis vinifera, each successfully pollinated flower becomes a grape berry with the inflorescence turning into a cluster of grapes. While the flowers of the grapevines are usually very small, the berries are often large and brightly colored with sweet flavors that attract birds and other animals to disperse the seeds contained within the berries.

Grapevines usually only produce fruit on shoots that came from buds that were developed during the previous growing season. In viticulture, this is one of the principles behind pruning the previous year's growth (or "One year old wood") that includes shoots that have turned hard and woody during the winter (after harvest in commercial viticulture). These vines will be pruned either into a cane which will support 8 to 15 buds or to a smaller spur which holds 2 to 3 buds.

== Description ==
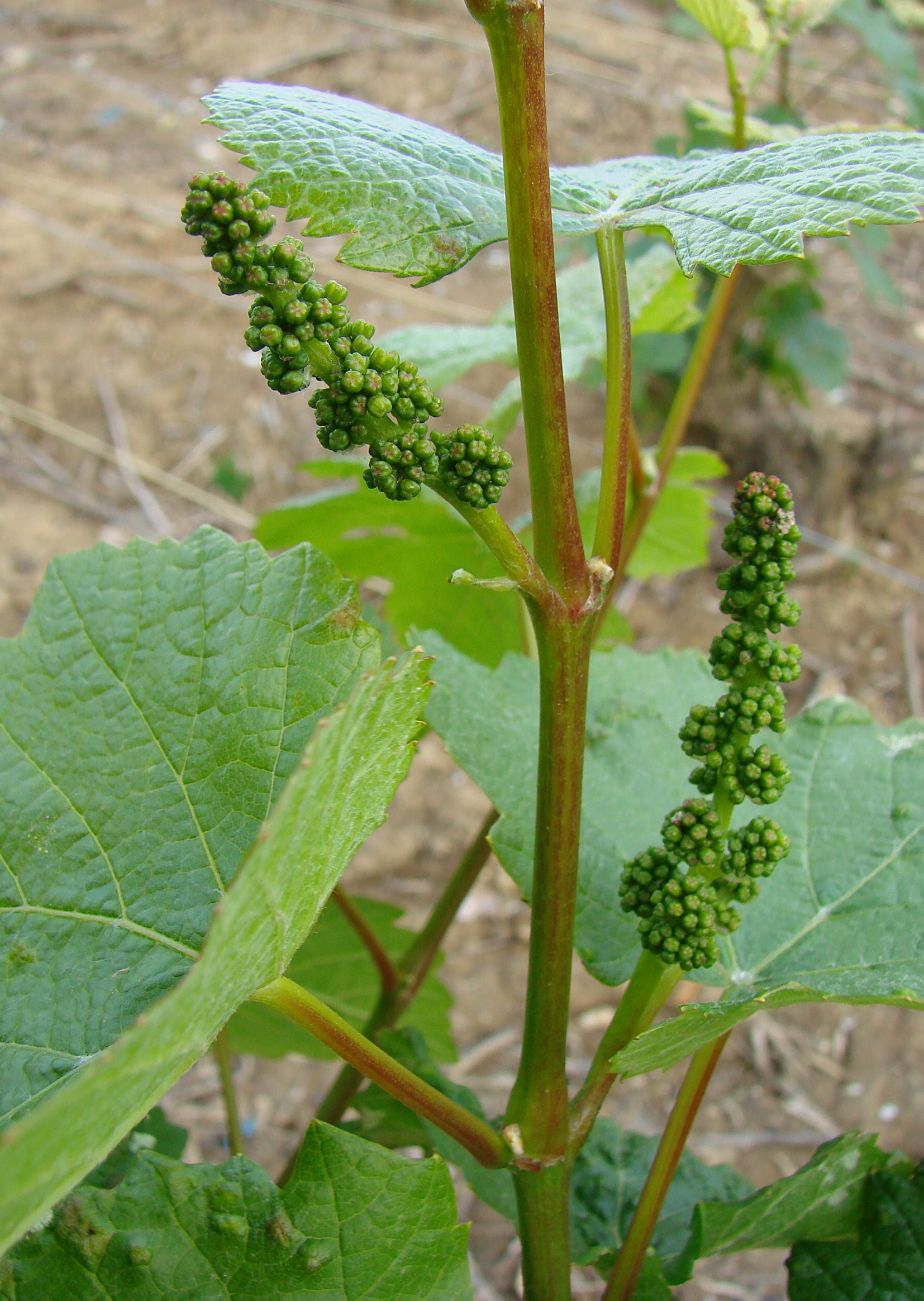
Developing inflorescences of Vitis vinifera

In the wild, all species of Vitis are normally dioecious, but under domestication, variants with perfect flowers appear to have been selected. Flower buds are formed late in the growing season and overwinter for blooming in the spring of the next year. They produce leaf-opposed cymes. Vitis is distinguished from other genera in the Vitaceae family by its petals, which remain joined at the tip and detach from the base to fall off together as a calyptra or 'cap'. The flowers are pentamerous. The calyx is greatly reduced or nonexistent in most species. The fruit is a berry in botanical terms, ovoid in shape and juicy, with a two-celled ovary each containing two ovules, thus normally producing four seeds per flower (or fewer by way of aborted embryos).

Other parts of the vine include the tendrils which are leaf-opposed, branched in Vitis vinifera, and support the climbing plant by twining around surrounding structures such as branches or the trellising of a vine-training system.

The genus Vitis is divided into two subgenera, Euvitis Planch. have 38 chromosomes (n=19) with berries borne on clusters and Muscadinia Planch. 40 (n=20) with small clusters.

Wild grapes can resemble the single-seeded Menispermum canadense (moonseed), which is toxic.

== Species ==
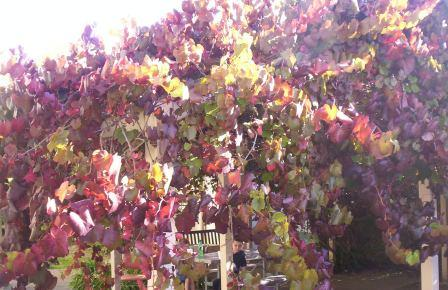
Vitis coignetiae with autumn leaves

Most Vitis species are found mostly in the temperate regions of the Northern Hemisphere in North America and eastern Asia, exceptions being a few in the tropics and the wine grape Vitis vinifera which originated in southern Europe and southwestern Asia. Grape species occur in widely different geographical areas and show a great diversity of form.

Their growth makes leaf collection challenging and polymorphic leaves make identification of species difficult. Mature grapevines can grow up to 48 centimetres (19 inches) in diameter and reach the upper canopy of trees more than 35 metres (115 feet) tall.

Many species are sufficiently closely related to allow easy interbreeding and the resultant interspecific hybrids are invariably fertile and vigorous. Thus the concept of a species is less well defined and more likely represents the identification of different ecotypes of Vitis that have evolved in distinct geographical and environmental circumstances.

The exact number of species is not certain. Plants of the World Online states 80 species and three hybrids are accepted. More than 65 species in Asia are poorly defined. Approximately 25 species are known in North America, and these were studied extensively in the late 1800s by German-American botanist George Englemann. By contrast, just one, V. vinifera has Eurasian origins.

As of December 2025, Plants of the World Online accepts the following 83 species:

- Vitis acerifolia Raf.
- Vitis aestivalis Michx.
- Vitis amoena Z.H.Chen, Feng Chen & W.Y.Xie
- Vitis amurensis Rupr.
- Vitis arizonica Engelm.
- Vitis baihuashanensis M.S.Kang & D.Z.Lu
- Vitis balansana Planch.
- Vitis bashanica P.C.He
- Vitis bellula (Rehder) W.T.Wang
- Vitis berlandieri Planch.
- Vitis betulifolia Diels & Gilg
- Vitis biformis Rose
- Vitis blancoi Munson
- Vitis bloodworthiana Comeaux
- Vitis bourgaeana Planch.
- Vitis bryoniifolia Bunge
- Vitis californica Benth.
- Vitis × champinii Planch.
- Vitis chunganensis Hu
- Vitis chungii F.P.Metcalf
- Vitis cinerea (Engelm.) Millardet
- Vitis coignetiae Pulliat ex Planch.
- Vitis davidii (Rom.Caill.) Foëx
- Vitis × doaniana Munson ex Viala
- Vitis erythrophylla W.T.Wang
- Vitis fengqinensis C.L.Li
- Vitis ficifolia Bunge
- Vitis flavicosta Mickel & Beitel
- Vitis flexuosa Thunb.
- Vitis girdiana Munson
- Vitis hancockii Hance
- Vitis heyneana Schult.
- Vitis hissarica Vassilcz.
- Vitis hui W.C.Cheng
- Vitis jaegeriana Comeaux
- Vitis jinggangensis W.T.Wang
- Vitis jinzhainensis X.S.Shen
- Vitis kaihuaica Z.H.Chen, Feng Chen & W.Y.Xie
- Vitis kiusiana Momiy.
- Vitis labrusca L.
- Vitis lanceolatifoliosa C.L.Li
- Vitis longquanensis P.L.Chiu
- Vitis luochengensis W.T.Wang
- Vitis menghaiensis C.L.Li
- Vitis mengziensis C.L.Li
- Vitis monticola Buckley
- Vitis mustangensis Buckley
- Vitis nesbittiana Comeaux
- Vitis × novae-angliae Fernald
- Vitis novogranatensis Moldenke
- Vitis nuristanica Vassilcz.
- Vitis palmata Vahl
- Vitis pedicellata M.A.Lawson
- Vitis peninsularis M.E.Jones
- Vitis piasezkii Maxim.
- Vitis pilosonervia F.P.Metcalf
- Vitis popenoei J.L.Fennell
- Vitis pseudoreticulata W.T.Wang
- Vitis qinlingensis P.C.He
- Vitis retordii Rom.Caill. ex Planch.
- Vitis riparia Michx.
- Vitis romanetii Rom.Caill.
- Vitis rotundifolia Michx.
- Vitis rupestris Scheele
- Vitis ruyuanensis C.L.Li
- Vitis saccharifera Makino
- Vitis shenxiensis C.L.Li
- Vitis shizishanensis Z.Y.Ma, J.Wen, Q.Fu & X.Q.Liu
- Vitis shuttleworthii House
- Vitis silvestrii Pamp.
- Vitis sinocinerea W.T.Wang
- Vitis sinoternata W.T.Wang
- Vitis tiliifolia Humb. & Bonpl. ex Schult.
- Vitis tsoi Merr.
- Vitis vinifera L.
- Vitis vulpina L.
- Vitis wenchowensis C.Ling
- Vitis wenxianensis W.T.Wang
- Vitis wilsoniae H.J.Veitch
- Vitis wuhanensis C.L.Li
- Vitis xunyangensis P.C.He
- Vitis yunnanensis C.L.Li
- Vitis zhejiang-adstricta P.L.Chiu

There are many cultivars of grapevines; most are cultivars of V. vinifera, including Vitis 'Ornamental Grape'.

Hybrid grapes also exist, and these are primarily crosses between V. vinifera and one or more of V. labrusca, V. riparia or V. aestivalis. Hybrids tend to be less susceptible to frost and disease (notably phylloxera), but wine from some hybrids may have a little of the characteristic "foxy" taste of V. labrusca.

The Latin word Vitis is feminine, and therefore adjectival species names take feminine forms, such as V. vinifera. (Note: -fer is an adjectival suffix, with forms -fer (M), -fera (F), and -ferum (N).)

== Ecology ==
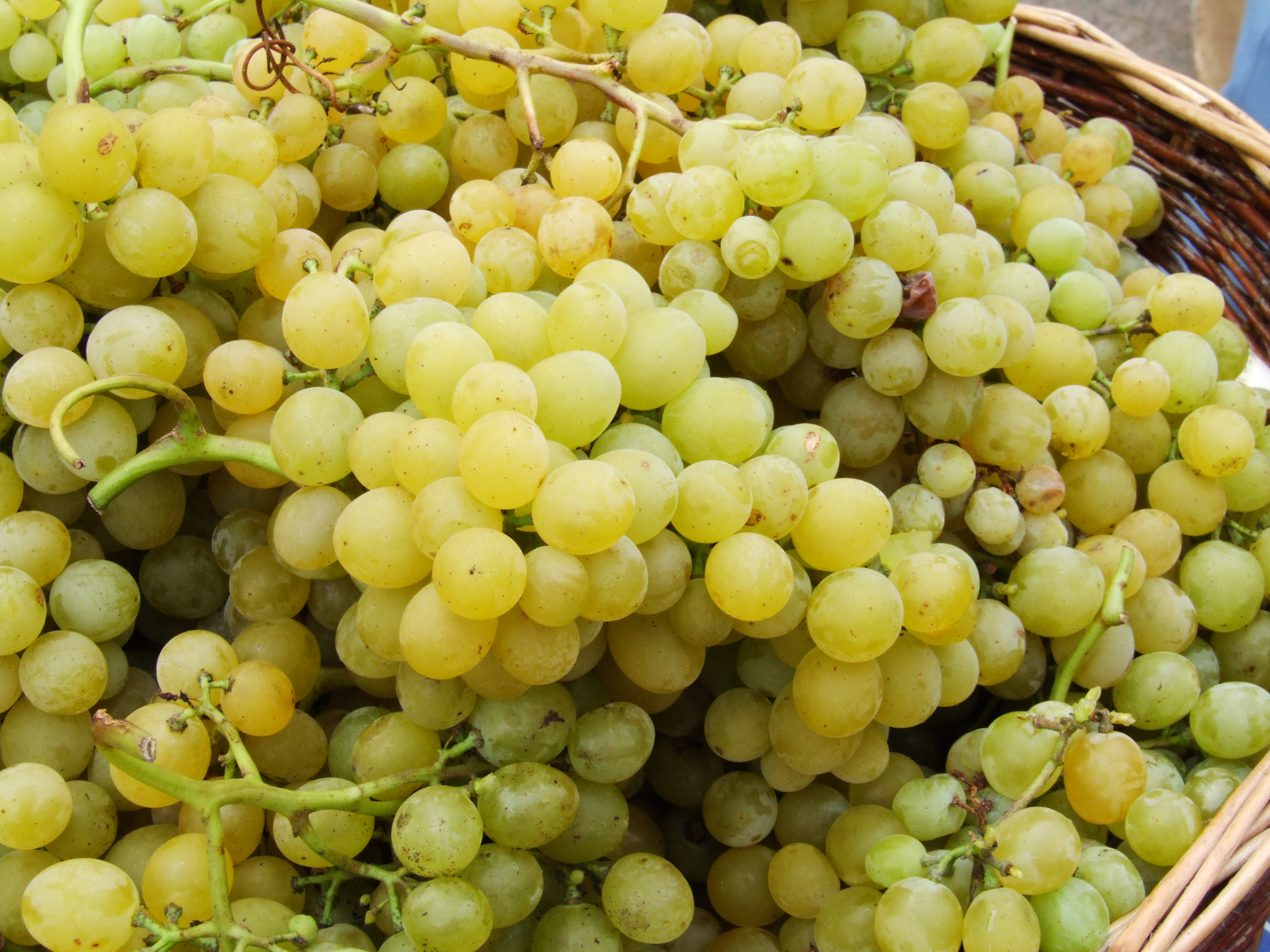
'Palatina', a Hungary grape

Phylloxera is an American root aphid that devastated V. vinifera vineyards in Europe when accidentally introduced in the late 19th century. Attempts were made to breed in resistance from American species, but many winemakers and customers did not like the unusual flavour profile of the hybrid vines. However, V. vinifera grafts readily onto rootstocks of the American species and their hybrids with V. vinifera, and most commercial production of grapes now relies on such grafts.

The black vine weevil is another root pest.

Grapevines are used as food plants by the larvae of some Lepidoptera species.

== Commercial distribution ==
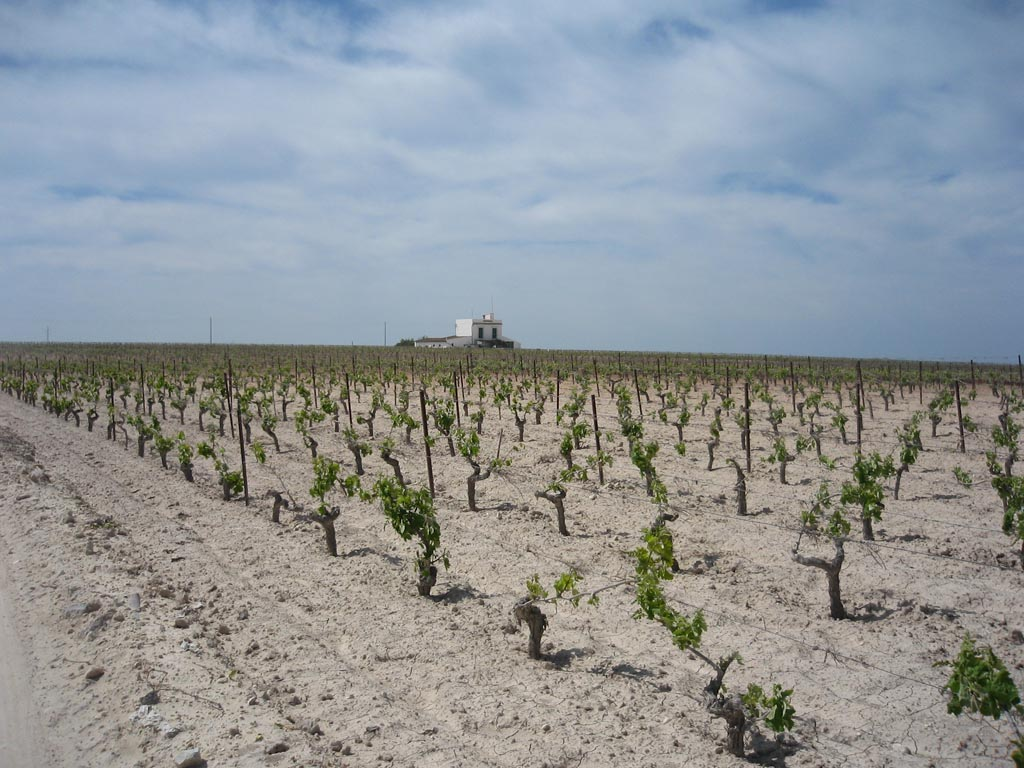
Vitis for producing Sherry at Jerez

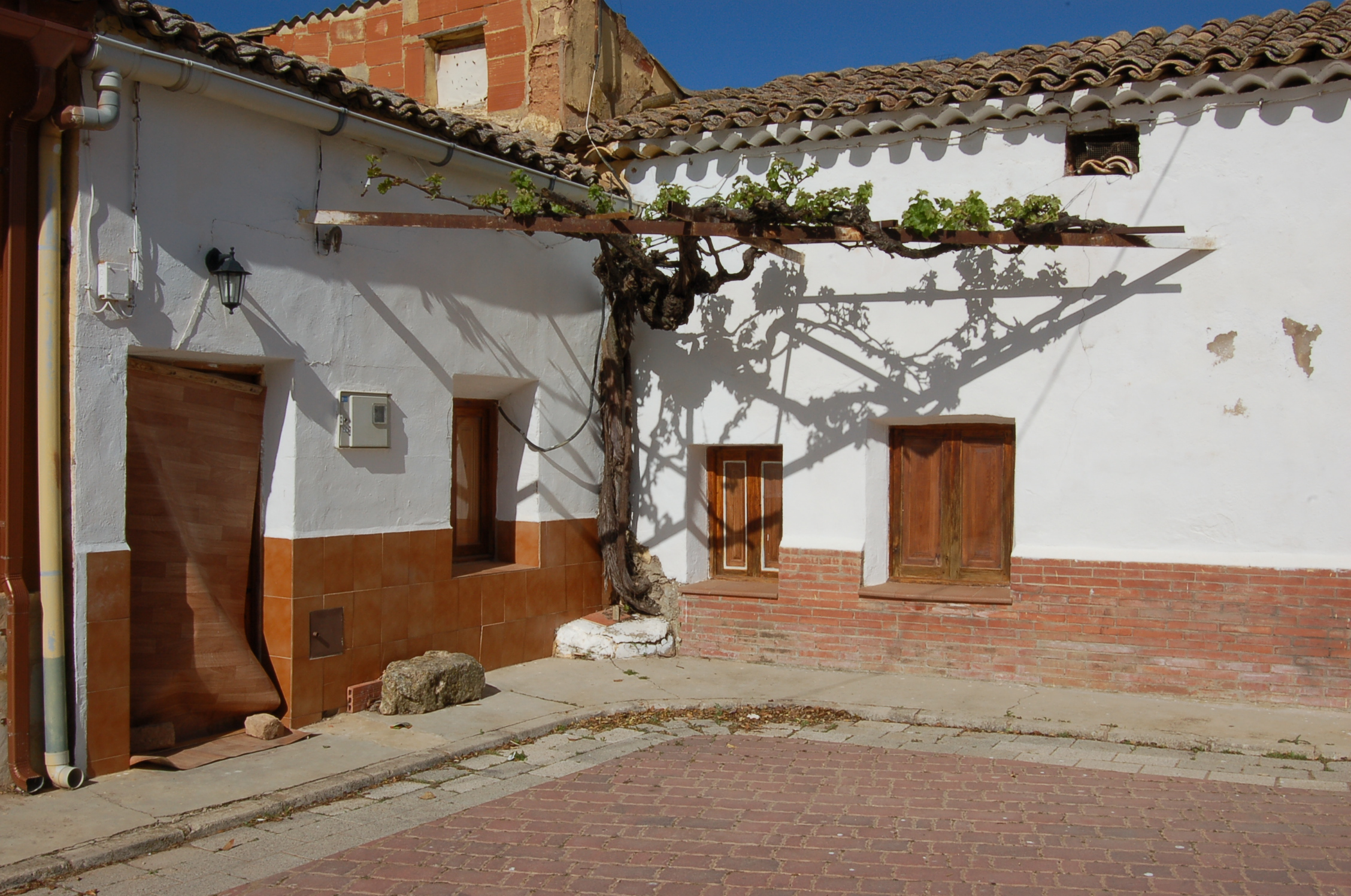
Vitis near a house in Hontecillas

According to the UN's Food and Agriculture Organization (FAO), 75,866 square kilometres (29,292 sq mi) of the world is dedicated to grapes. Approximately 71% of world grape production is used for wine, 27% as fresh fruit, and 2% as dried fruit. A portion of grape production goes to producing grape juice to be used as a sweetener for fruits canned "with no added sugar" and "100% natural". The area dedicated to vineyards is increasing by about 2% per year.

The following list of top wine-producers shows the corresponding areas dedicated to grapes (regardless of the grapes' final destination):

Country	Area under vine (ha ×10^{3})	Grape production (metric ton ×10^{6})
World	7511	75.7
Spain	1021	6.0
China	830	12.6
France	786	6.3
Italy	682	8.2
Turkey	497	3.6
United States	419	7.0
Argentina	225	2.4
Iran	223	2.1
Portugal	217	
Chile	211	3.1
Romania	192	
Australia	149	1.7
Moldova	140	
South Africa	130	2.0
India	120	2.6
Brazil	85	1.5
Bulgaria	60	
New Zealand	39	

== Domestic cultivation ==
Grapevines are widely cultivated by gardeners, and numerous suppliers cater specifically for this trade. The plants are valued for their decorative foliage, often colouring brightly in autumn; their ability to clothe walls, pergolas and arches, thus providing shade; and their fruits, which may be eaten as dessert or provide the basis for homemade wines. Popular varieties include:-

- 'Buckland Sweetwater' (white dessert)
- 'Chardonnay' (white wine)
- 'Foster's Seedling' (white dessert)
- 'Grenache' (red wine)
- 'Muscat of Alexandria' (white dessert)
- 'Müller-Thurgau' (white wine)
- 'Phoenix' (white wine)
- 'Pinot noir' (red wine)
- 'Regent' (red wine)
- 'Schiava Grossa' (red dessert)
- 'Seyval blanc' (white wine)
- 'Tempranillo' (red wine)

The following varieties have gained the Royal Horticultural Society's Award of Garden Merit:-

- 'Boskoop Glory' (dessert/wine)
- 'Brant' (black dessert)
- 'Claret Cloak' or 'Frovit' (ornamental)
- 'New York Muscat' (black dessert)
- 'Purpurea' (ornamental)

== Uses ==
The fruit of several Vitis species are grown commercially for consumption as fresh grapes and for fermentation into wine. Vitis vinifera is the most important such species.

The leaves of several species of grapevine are edible and are used in the production of dolmades and sometimes used in as a substitute for Vietnamese lốt leaves.

== Culture ==
=== Ancient Greece ===
The grapevine (typically Vitis vinifera) has been used as a symbol since ancient times. In Greek mythology, Dionysus (called Bacchus by the Ancient Romans) was god of the vintage and, therefore, a grapevine with bunches of the fruit are among his attributes. His attendants at the Bacchanalian festivals hence had the vine as an attribute. For the same reason, the Greek wine cup (cantharos) is commonly decorated with the vine and grapes, wine being drunk as a libation to the god.

=== Ancient Israel and Judaism ===
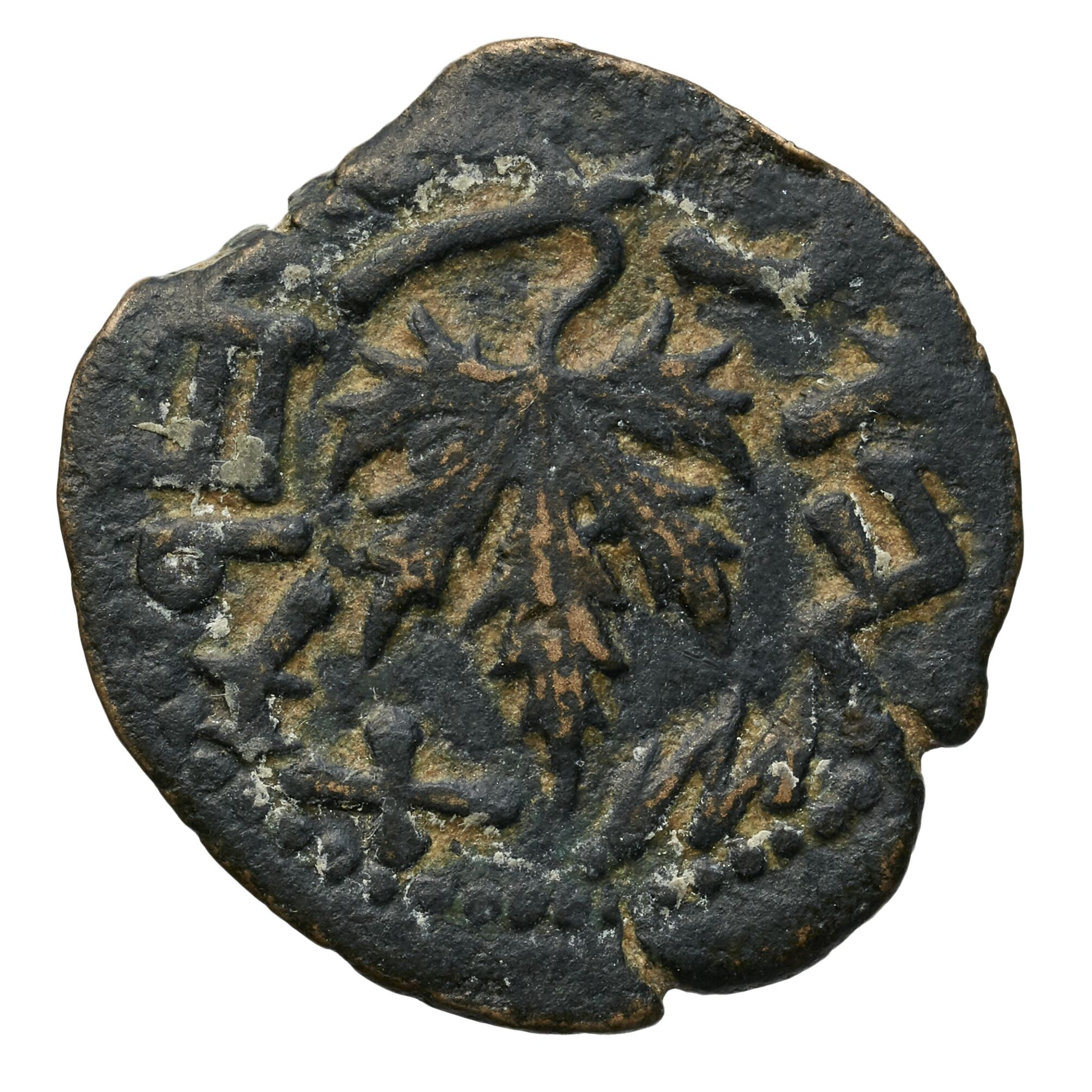
A grapevine leaf, depicted on a bronze coin from the Great Jewish Revolt

The grapevine has held profound symbolic significance in Jewish tradition and culture since antiquity. It is referenced 55 times in the Hebrew Bible (Old Testament), along with grapes and wine, which are also frequently mentioned (55 and 19, respectively). Grapes are regarded as one of the Seven Species which the land of Israel was blessed with. The vine is employed several times in the Bible as a symbol of the Israelites as the chosen people. Along with the fig tree, the grapevine appears in biblical passages as a symbol of peace, stability, and prosperity.

The grapevine has a prominent place in Jewish rituals: the wine was given a special blessing, "creator of the fruit of the vine", and the Kiddush blessing is recited over wine or grape juice on Shabbat and Jewish holidays. It is also employed in various parables and sayings in rabbinic literature. According to Josephus and the Mishnah, a golden vine was hung over the inner chamber of the Second Temple. The grapevine is featured on Hasmonean and Bar Kokhba revolt coinage, and as a decoration in mosaic floors of ancient synagogues.

=== Christianity ===
In Christian iconography, the vine also frequently appears. It is mentioned several times in the New Testament. We have the parable of the kingdom of heaven likened to the father starting to engage laborers for his vineyard. The vine is used as symbol of Jesus Christ based on his own statement, "I am the true vine (John 15:1)." In that sense, a vine is placed as sole symbol on the tomb of Constantia, the sister of Constantine the Great, and elsewhere. In Byzantine art, the vine and grapes figure in early mosaics, and on the throne of Maximianus of Ravenna it is used as a decoration.

The vine and wheat ear have been frequently used as symbol of the blood and flesh of Christ, hence figuring as symbols (bread and wine) of the Eucharist and are found depicted on ostensories. Often the symbolic vine laden with grapes is found in ecclesiastical decorations with animals biting at the grapes. At times, the vine is used as symbol of temporal blessing.

=== Mandaeism ===
In Mandaeism, uthras (angels or celestial beings) are often described as personified grapevines.

== See also ==
- Vine staff
- Annual growth cycle of grapevines
