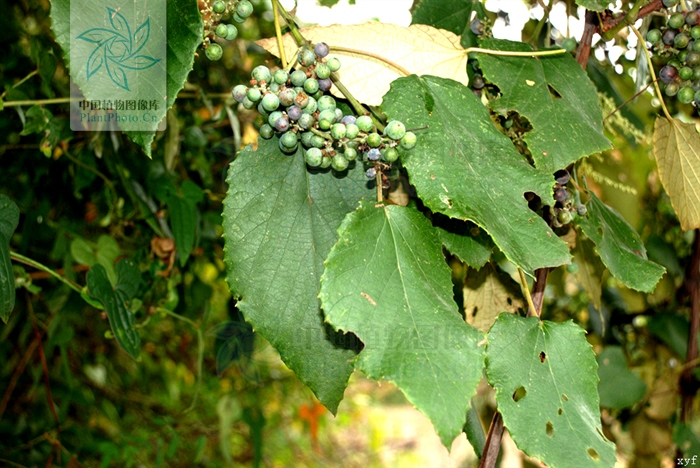
- Vine with grapes observed in Hubei

Scientific classification
- Kingdom: Plantae
- Clade: Tracheophytes
- Clade: Angiosperms
- Clade: Eudicots
- Clade: Rosids
- Order: Vitales
- Family: Vitaceae
- Genus: Vitis
- Species: V. bellula

Binomial name
- Vitis bellula W.T. Wang (1979)

Synonyms
- Vitis pentagona var. bellula Rehder (1917); Vitis quinquangularis var. bellula (Rehder) Rehder (1945)

= Vitis bellula =

Beautiful grape

Species of grapevine

Vitis bellula, commonly known as the beautiful grape or small leaf hair grape, is a Chinese liana (woody vine) in the grape family. It is native to the provinces of Guangdong, Guangxi, Hubei, Hunan, and Sichuan. The plant grows at elevations of 400–1,600 m (1,300–5,200 ft) and bears medium-sized purplish-black grapes.

== Gallery ==
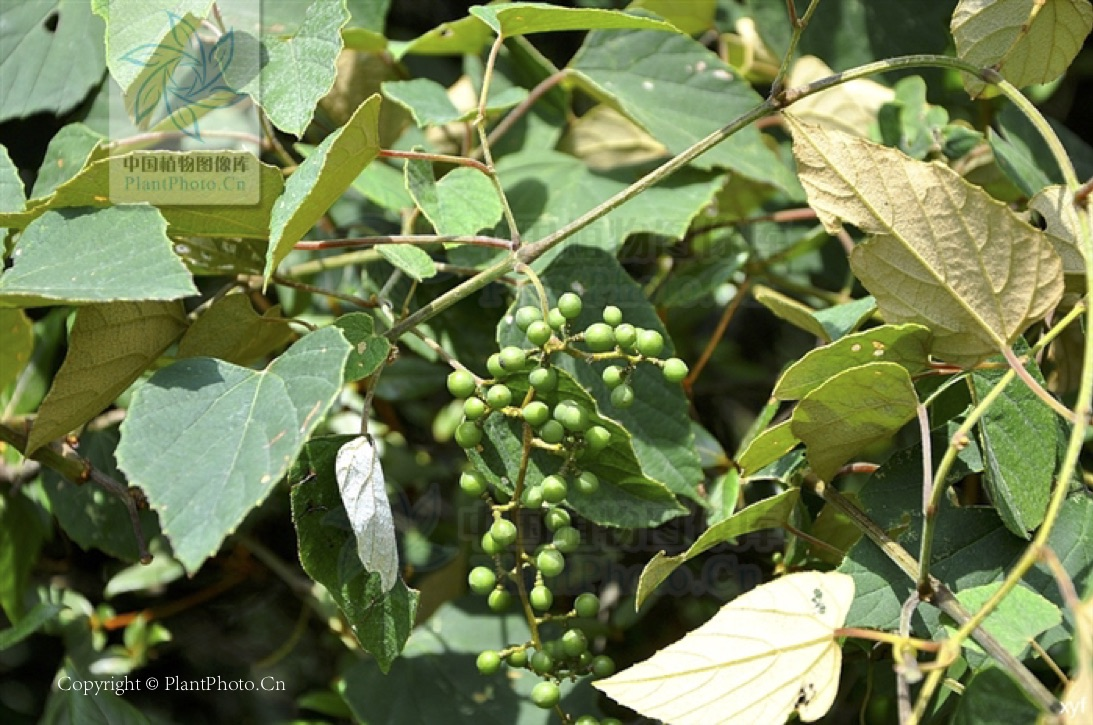
Photo

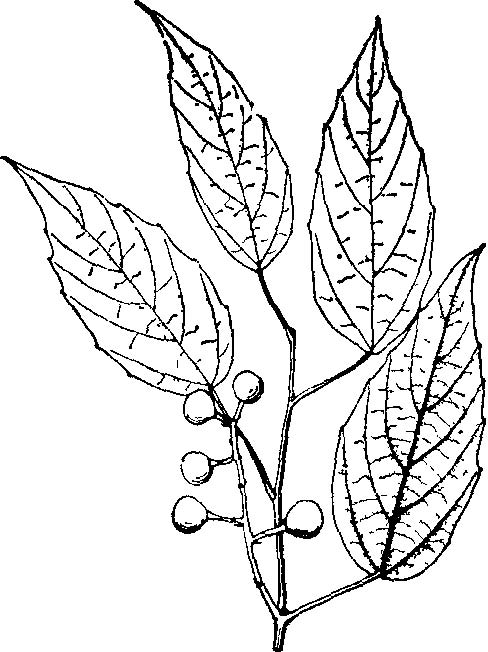
Illustration
