= Vitis chunganensis =

Scientific classification
- Kingdom: Plantae
- Clade: Tracheophytes
- Clade: Angiosperms
- Clade: Eudicots
- Clade: Rosids
- Order: Vitales
- Family: Vitaceae
- Genus: Vitis
- Species: V. chunganensis

Binomial name
- Vitis chunganensis Hu

Species of grapevine

Vitis chunganensis is a species of climbing vine in the grape family native to China (Anhui, Fujian, Guangdong, Guangxi, Hunan, Jiangxi, and Zhejiang provinces). In Chinese it is called dong nan pu tao, or Southeast grape.

Habitats include forests and shrublands, hillsides and valleys, especially those where streams are present, between 500 and 1400 meters above sea-level. Flowers appear from April to June, producing very dark, purple, globose berries, about 1 cm in diameter, from June through to August.

It is traditionally used as folk medicine for the treatment of infectious hepatitis and physical injury. It contains chunganenol which is a resveratrol hexamer.
