= Vitis mengziensis =

Scientific classification
- Kingdom: Plantae
- Clade: Tracheophytes
- Clade: Angiosperms
- Clade: Eudicots
- Clade: Rosids
- Order: Vitales
- Family: Vitaceae
- Genus: Vitis
- Species: V. mengziensis

Binomial name
- Vitis mengziensis C.L.Li

Species of grapevine

Vitis mengziensis is a species of plant in the grape family. It is found in the province of Yunnan in China, where it is known by the name meng zi pu tao, meaning Mengzi or Mengtze grape. The specific epithet mengziensis and vernacular Chinese name refer to Mengzi, a county in the southeast of Yunnan. It grows in temperate rainforests, at elevations near 1600 meters.
