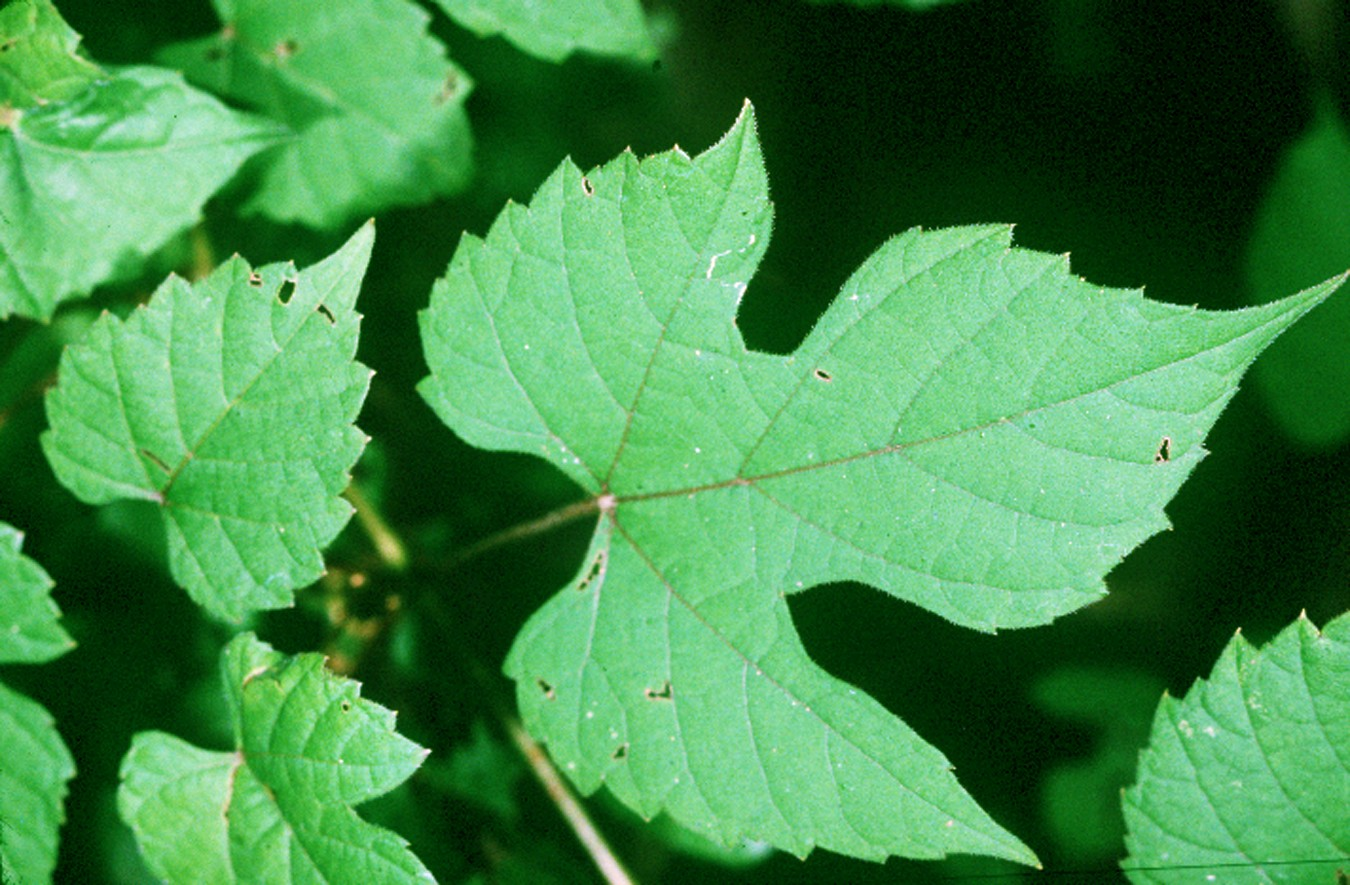

Scientific classification
- Kingdom: Plantae
- Clade: Tracheophytes
- Clade: Angiosperms
- Clade: Eudicots
- Clade: Rosids
- Order: Vitales
- Family: Vitaceae
- Genus: Vitis
- Species: V. palmata

Binomial name
- Vitis palmata Vahl

Synonyms
- V. rubra Michx. ex Planch., in DC.

= Vitis palmata =

Cat grape

Species of grapevine

Vitis palmata (common names are catbird grape, cat grape, and Missouri grape) is a New World species of tall, climbing liana in the grape family native to the south-central and southeastern parts of the United States, from Texas east to Florida and northwards along the Mississippi Valley to Illinois. There are additional reports of isolated populations in the Northeast, but these are probably introductions.) The species does best in wet habitats but is adaptable enough to occasionally take root in higher-ground habitats. It is sometimes found at the edges of fences.

== Description ==
The epithet "palmata" notes its characteristic, palmately lobed leaves (3–5 lobes per leaf, acuminate with rounded sinuses). These are ovate, and typically about 10–15 cm long and wide, usually lacking hairs.

Its tendrils are branched.

Its flowers appear in late Spring. The inflorescences are densely compound panicles measuring 5–15 cm in length.

Its dark purple or blackish berries measure 5–8 mm in diameter, and come into ripeness late in the Summer. They are consumed by many birds and animals, and can be made into wild grape jelly, although not all are juicy or particularly flavorful.

Leaves and tendrils, flowers and fruit all spring from herbaceous, crimson branches
