= Vitis ruyuanensis =

Scientific classification
- Kingdom: Plantae
- Clade: Tracheophytes
- Clade: Angiosperms
- Clade: Eudicots
- Clade: Rosids
- Order: Vitales
- Family: Vitaceae
- Genus: Vitis
- Species: V. ruyuanensis

Binomial name
- Vitis ruyuanensis C.L.Li

Species of grapevine

Vitis ruyuanensis (known locally as ru yuan pu tao, which means Ruyuan grape) is a species of polygamo-dioecious plant in the grape family native to the Chinese province of Guangdong. Here it grows in shrublands or along hillsides at around 200 meters. Flowers, blooming between April and May, give way to the development of globular berries in June and July.
