= Vitis betulifolia =

Scientific classification
- Kingdom: Plantae
- Clade: Tracheophytes
- Clade: Angiosperms
- Clade: Eudicots
- Clade: Rosids
- Order: Vitales
- Family: Vitaceae
- Genus: Vitis
- Species: V. betulifolia

Binomial name
- Vitis betulifolia Diels & Gilg

Synonyms
- V. hexamera Gagnep. V. shimenensis W.T.Wang; V. trichoclada Diels & Gilg.

Species of grapevine

Vitis betulifolia is a widely ranging species of liana in the grape family native to China (found in Gansu, Henan, Hubei, Hunan, Shaanxi, Sichuan and Yunnan provinces) where its habitat is forested or shrubby valleys and hillsides, at elevations from 600 to 3,600 metres (2,000 to 11,800 ft).

Vitis betulifolia has rather long intervals for both flowering (March — June) and fruiting (June — November), bearing globose, blackish-purple berries.

Although there may be no vernacular English name for this species, the Chinese name is hua ye pu tao, which translates to "birch-leaf grape". Both the Latin word used for the epithet (betulifolia) and the Chinese hua ye mean "birch leaf".
