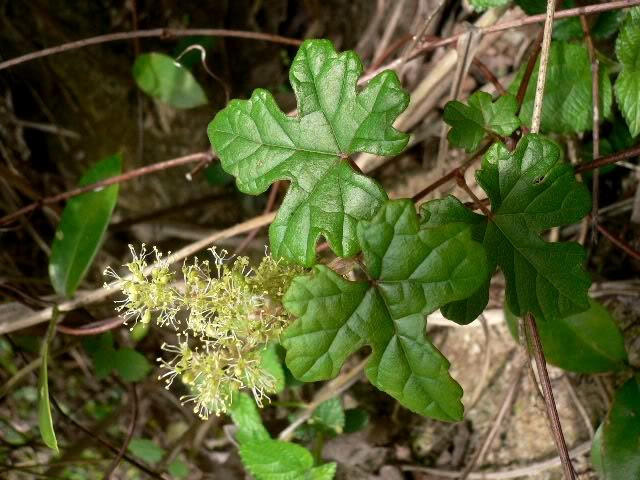
- Male vine flowering

Scientific classification
- Kingdom: Plantae
- Clade: Embryophytes
- Clade: Tracheophytes
- Clade: Spermatophytes
- Clade: Angiosperms
- Clade: Eudicots
- Clade: Rosids
- Order: Vitales
- Family: Vitaceae
- Genus: Vitis
- Species: V. bryoniifolia

Binomial name
- Vitis bryoniifolia Bunge

Varieties
- V. b. var. bryoniifolia (autonym); V. b. var. ternata (W.T.Wang) C.L.Li

Synonyms
- Synonyms for V. b. var. bryoniifolia; Vitis adstricta Hance; V. bryoniifolia var. mairei (H.Lév.) W.T.Wang; V. bryoniifolia var. multilobata S.Y.Wang & Y.H.Hu; V. flexuosa var. mairei H.Lév.; V. novisinensis Vassilcz.; V. thunbergii var. adstricta (Hance) Gagnep.; V. thunbergii var. mairei (H.Lév.) Lauener; Synon. for V. b. var. ternata; V. adstricta var. ternata W.T.Wang

= Vitis bryoniifolia =

Species of grapevine

Vitis bryoniifolia is a prolific and adaptable, polygamo-dioecious species of climbing vine in the grape family native to China, where it is known as ying yu(Traditional Chinese: 蘡薁 Simplified Chinese: 蘡薁), or hua bei pu tao (Traditional Chinese: 華北葡萄 Simplified Chinese：华北葡萄） (North China grape). The variant form ternata is known as san chu ying yu （Traditional and Simplified Chinese: 三出蘡薁), meaning Three-Spiked-Leafed Ying Yu.

Vitis bryoniifolia is found in a wide variety of tree-established habitats including forests and shrublands, or fields and valleys where trees are present, especially along the banks of streams; and can be found both in highlands and low- (100–2500 meters above sea-level). It has a long growing season, flowering from April to August, and bearing its fruit (rosy, plum-colored berries, 5–8 mm. in diameter) from June to October; and also a broad distributional range, being reported from 15 of China's 27 provinces and autonomous regions (Anhui, Fujian, Guangdong, Guangxi, Hebei, Hubei, Hunan, Jiangsu, Jiangxi, Shaanxi, Shandong, Shanxi, Sichuan, Yunnan and Zhejiang). It has long been used in Traditional Chinese Medicine as a laxative.
