= Vitis wuhanensis =

Scientific classification
- Kingdom: Plantae
- Clade: Tracheophytes
- Clade: Angiosperms
- Clade: Eudicots
- Clade: Rosids
- Order: Vitales
- Family: Vitaceae
- Genus: Vitis
- Species: V. wuhanensis

Binomial name
- Vitis wuhanensis C.L.Li

Synonyms
- V. w. var. arachnoidea X.D.Wang & C.L.Li.

Species of grapevine

Vitis wuhanensis (known locally as wu han pu tao, meaning Wuhan grape) is a tropical or sub-tropical, polygamo-dioecious species of liana in the grape family native to the Chinese provinces of Henan (far south, near Xinyang), Hubei and Jiangxi, found in valleys and along hillsides, in forests or shrublands, at elevations from 300 up to 700 meters. It flowers in April and May (male flowers have abortive gynoecia), and bears globular berries (6–7 mm. diam.) as early as May, and as late as July.

The specimen that was later to be named V. b. var. arachnoidea was collected from Jiangxi province in the vicinity of Pingxiang. The elevation was somewhere between 300 and 700 meters.
