= Vitis menghaiensis =

Scientific classification
- Kingdom: Plantae
- Clade: Tracheophytes
- Clade: Angiosperms
- Clade: Eudicots
- Clade: Rosids
- Order: Vitales
- Family: Vitaceae
- Genus: Vitis
- Species: V. menghaiensis

Binomial name
- Vitis menghaiensis C.L.Li

Species of grapevine

Vitis menghaiensis is a species of climbing vine in the grape family native to China. It is found in mixed forests around 1500–1600 meters above sea-level. It flowers in May, and male flowers have non-functioning ovaries.

In Chinese it is known as meng hai pu tao, or Menghai grape. It is named for Menghai [courageous sea] county in Yunnan. This is also the derivation for the epithet menghaiensis. In Chinese pu tao means "grape".
