= Chunganenol =

Names
- Preferred IUPAC name (2^{1}S,2^{5}R,2^{6}R,2^{6a}S,2^{7}S,2^{11b}S,6^{2}S,6^{3}S,6^{5}S,6^{6}S)-2^{6},2^{7},6^{2},6^{6}-Tetrakis(4-hydroxyphenyl)-6^{4}-[(1E)-2-(4-hydroxyphenyl)ethen-1-yl]-2^{1},2^{5},2^{6},2^{6a},2^{7},2^{11b},6^{2},6^{3},6^{5},6^{6}-decahydro-2(1,5)-benzo[3,4]azuleno[7,8,1-cde][1]benzofurana-6(3,5)-benzo[1,2-b:5,4-b′]difurana-1,7(1),3(1,2),5(1,4)-tetrabenzenaheptaphane-1^{4},2^{4},2^{8},2^{10},3^{3},3^{5},5^{2},5^{6},7^{3},7^{5}-decol

Identifiers
3D model (JSmol)	Interactive image
PubChem CID	44473743
CompTox Dashboard (EPA)	DTXSID701031835
- InChI: InChI=1S/C85H64O18/c86-47-14-1-39(2-15-47)3-26-57-75-68(102-83(42-8-20-50(89)21-9-42)72(75)45-27-53(92)31-54(93)28-45)38-69-76(57)73(84(103-69)43-10-22-51(90)23-11-43)46-29-62(96)60(63(97)30-46)36-58-59(32-55(94)34-64(58)98)77-71(41-6-18-49(88)19-7-41)81-70(40-4-16-48(87)17-5-40)74-61(33-56(95)35-65(74)99)78-80-67(37-66(100)79(77)82(80)81)101-85(78)44-12-24-52(91)25-13-44/h1-35,37-38,70-73,77-78,81,83-100H,36H2/b26-3+/t70-,71-,72-,73-,77-,78-,81+,83+,84+,85+/m0/s1 Key: FTFAHGCTWYRGNY-LGGXSKLGSA-N
- SMILES: [H][C@@]12[C@H]([C@@H](C3=C(O)C=C4O[C@H](C5=CC=C(O)C=C5)[C@]([H])(C4=C13)C1=CC(O)=CC(O)=C1[C@@H]2C1=CC=C(O)C=C1)C1=C(CC2=C(O)C=C(C=C2O)[C@@H]2[C@H](OC3=C2C(\C=C\C2=CC=C(O)C=C2)=C2[C@@H]([C@H](OC2=C3)C2=CC=C(O)C=C2)C2=CC(O)=CC(O)=C2)C2=CC=C(O)C=C2)C(O)=CC(O)=C1)C1=CC=C(O)C=C1

Properties
Chemical formula	C_{85}H_{64}O_{18}
Molar mass	1373.429 g·mol^{−1}
Appearance	Colorless amorphous powder
- Except where otherwise noted, data are given for materials in their standard state (at 25 °C [77 °F], 100 kPa). Infobox references

Chunganenol is a resveratrol hexamer found in Vitis chunganensis.
