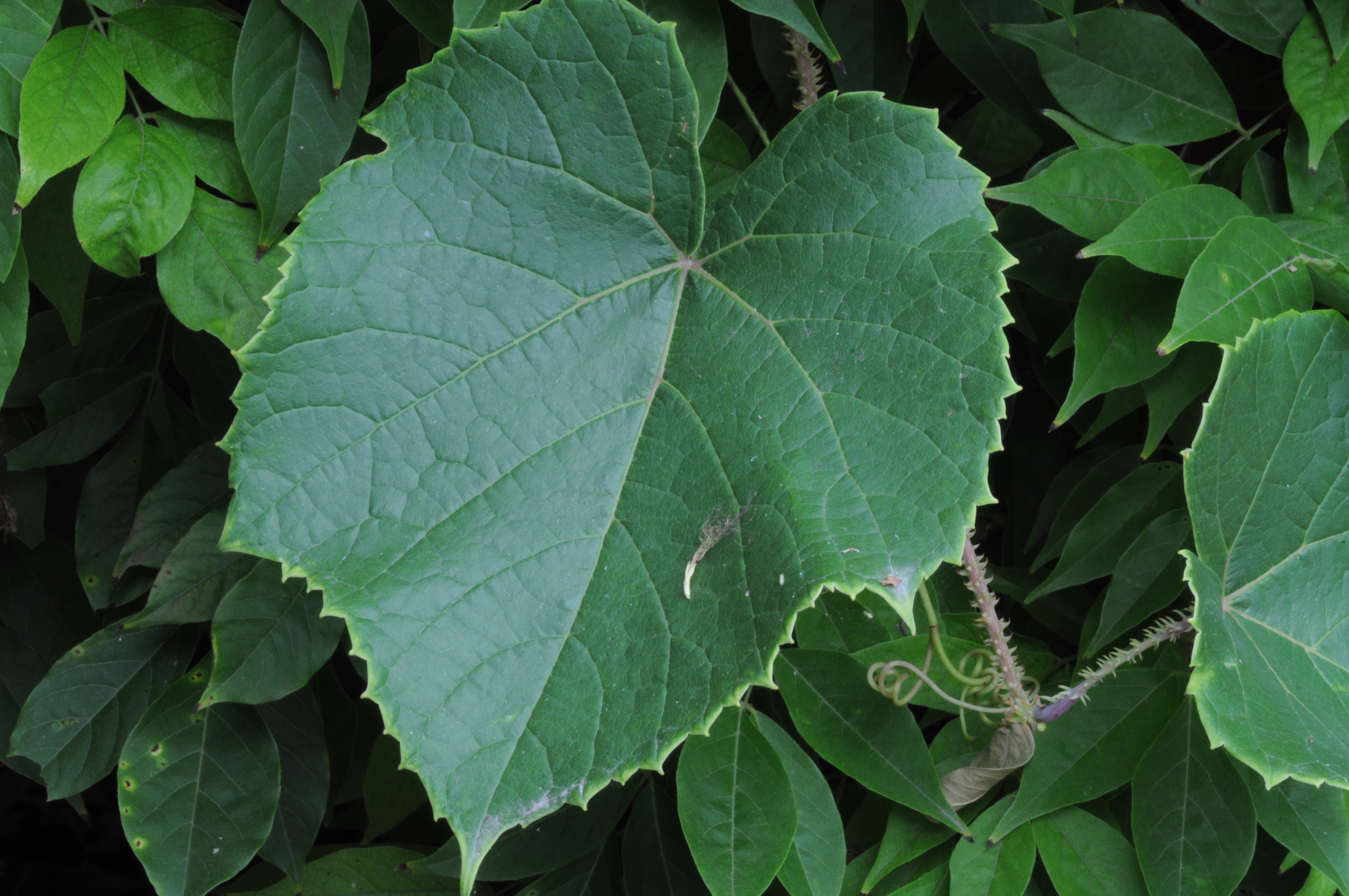

Scientific classification
- Kingdom: Plantae
- Clade: Tracheophytes
- Clade: Angiosperms
- Clade: Eudicots
- Clade: Rosids
- Order: Vitales
- Family: Vitaceae
- Genus: Vitis
- Species: V. davidii

Binomial name
- Vitis davidii (Rom.Caill.) Foex 1886

= Vitis davidii =

Species of grapevine

Vitis davidii is a species of vining plant native to Asia. The plant grows to a height of up to 8 m (25 ft) and bears small, black grapes. It is also known as the Chinese bramble grape.
