= Vitis blancoi =

Scientific classification
- Kingdom: Plantae
- Clade: Tracheophytes
- Clade: Angiosperms
- Clade: Eudicots
- Clade: Rosids
- Order: Vitales
- Family: Vitaceae
- Genus: Vitis
- Species: V. blancoi

Binomial name
- Vitis blancoi Munson

Species of grapevine

Vitis blancoi is a species of liana in the grape family which bears black berries, and is native to western Mexico.
