= Vitis hui =

Scientific classification
- Kingdom: Plantae
- Clade: Tracheophytes
- Clade: Angiosperms
- Clade: Eudicots
- Clade: Rosids
- Order: Vitales
- Family: Vitaceae
- Genus: Vitis
- Species: V. hui

Binomial name
- Vitis hui W.C.Cheng

Species of grapevine

Vitis hui is a species of plant in the grape family. It is native to Jiangxi and Zhejiang provinces in China, where it is called lu shan pu tao, meaning Mount Lushan grape. It grows in temperate climes, at elevations between 100 and 200 meters in shrublands and along the edges of open meadows.

Vitis hui flowers in May, bearing its fruit in July. It forms non-functional ovaries in male flowers.
