= Vitis yunnanensis =

Scientific classification
- Kingdom: Plantae
- Clade: Tracheophytes
- Clade: Angiosperms
- Clade: Eudicots
- Clade: Rosids
- Order: Vitales
- Family: Vitaceae
- Genus: Vitis
- Species: V. yunnanensis

Binomial name
- Vitis yunnanensis C.L.Li

Species of grapevine

Vitis yunnanensis (known locally as yun nan pu tao, meaning Yunnan grape) is a species of liana in the grape family native to the Chinese province of Yunnan (in Jingdong Yi Autonomous County and Jinghong). It is a forest dweller, found at various elevations between 500 and 1800 meters. In August it bears globular berries.
