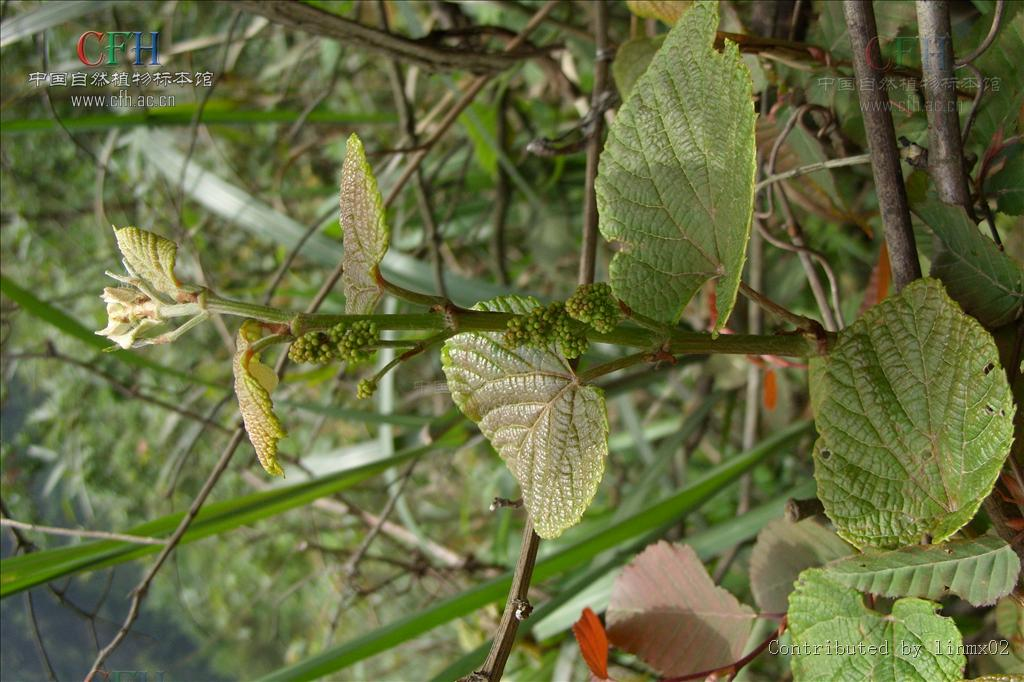

Scientific classification
- Kingdom: Plantae
- Clade: Tracheophytes
- Clade: Angiosperms
- Clade: Eudicots
- Clade: Rosids
- Order: Vitales
- Family: Vitaceae
- Genus: Vitis
- Species: V. wilsoniae

Binomial name
- Vitis wilsoniae Veitch

Synonyms
- Vitis marchandii H. Léveillé. 1913; Vitis reticulata Gagnepain. ex Pampanini. 1911 not M. A. Lawson. 1875

= Vitis wilsoniae =

Reticulated grape

Species of grapevine

Vitis wilsoniae is a vining plant in the grape family native to China. It is commonly known as the net veined grape or reticulated grape. This species can be found in the provinces of Anhui, Chongqing, Fujian, Gansu, Guizhou, Henan, Hubei, Hunan, Shaanxi, Sichuan, Yunnan, and Zhejiang. The plant grows at altitudes of 400-2000m.

The species was first described in 1909. Subsequent identifications of this species occurred in 1910, 1911, and 1913 using the names Vitis reticulata and Vitis marchandii.
