= Vitis chungii =

Scientific classification
- Kingdom: Plantae
- Clade: Tracheophytes
- Clade: Angiosperms
- Clade: Eudicots
- Clade: Rosids
- Order: Vitales
- Family: Vitaceae
- Genus: Vitis
- Species: V. chungii

Binomial name
- Vitis chungii F.P.Metcalf

Species of grapevine

Vitis chungii is a polygamo-dioecious species of wild grape native to China (in Fujian, Guangdong, Guangxi, and Jiangxi provinces) where it is known by the name min gan pu tao, or Fujian Jianxi grape. It is a forest inhabitant, 200–1000 meters above sea-level, on hillsides, in valleys, or other areas having wild, shrubby growth. It bears globular, ruddy-purple berries, 8–10 mm in diameter.
