= Vitis fengqinensis =

Scientific classification
- Kingdom: Plantae
- Clade: Tracheophytes
- Clade: Angiosperms
- Clade: Eudicots
- Clade: Rosids
- Order: Vitales
- Family: Vitaceae
- Genus: Vitis
- Species: V. fengqinensis

Binomial name
- Vitis fengqinensis C.L.Li

Species of grapevine

Vitis fengqinensis is a species of wild Chinese grape native to Yunnan province, where it is known by the name feng qing pu tao, meaning Fengking grape. It is generally found on shrubby slopes at about 2000 meters above sea-level. Its fruits come out in June.
