= Vitis nesbittiana =

Scientific classification
- Kingdom: Plantae
- Clade: Tracheophytes
- Clade: Angiosperms
- Clade: Eudicots
- Clade: Rosids
- Order: Vitales
- Family: Vitaceae
- Genus: Vitis
- Species: V. nesbittiana

Binomial name
- Vitis nesbittiana Comeaux

Species of grapevine

Vitis nesbittiana is a species of liana in the grape family. It is native to central Mexico (Veracruz).
