= Vitis jaegeriana =

Scientific classification
- Kingdom: Plantae
- Clade: Tracheophytes
- Clade: Angiosperms
- Clade: Eudicots
- Clade: Rosids
- Order: Vitales
- Family: Vitaceae
- Genus: Vitis
- Species: V. jaegeriana

Binomial name
- Vitis jaegeriana Comeaux

Species of grapevine

Vitis jaegeriana is a plant species in the grape family that is endemic to North-Central Mexico.

The vine is native to the state of San Luis Potosí region, including habitats in the Sierra Madre Oriental range .

It is a tertiary genetic relative of wine grapes.
