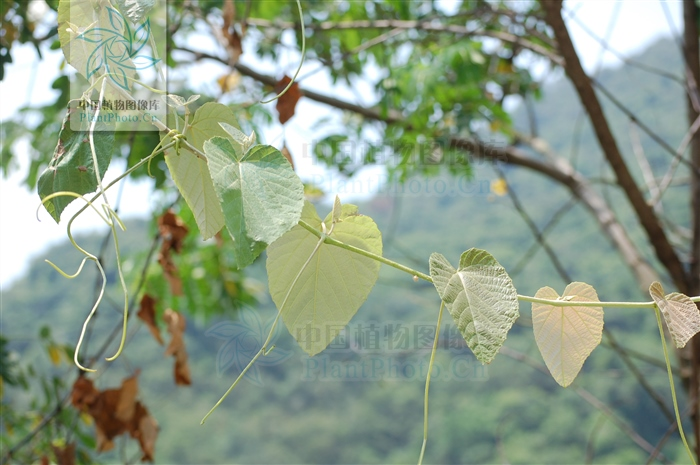

Scientific classification
- Kingdom: Plantae
- Clade: Embryophytes
- Clade: Tracheophytes
- Clade: Angiosperms
- Clade: Eudicots
- Clade: Rosids
- Order: Vitales
- Family: Vitaceae
- Genus: Vitis
- Species: V. retordii

Binomial name
- Vitis retordii Rom.Caill. ex Planch.

Synonyms
- Vitis hekouensis C.L.Li.

= Vitis retordii =

Woolly grape

Species of grapevine

Vitis retordii is a species of vining plant native to east Asia (China, Laos, Vietnam). The plant grows at an altitudes of 200–1,000 m (660–3,280 ft) and bears large grapes. It is also known as the woolly grape.
