= Vitis xunyangensis =

Scientific classification
- Kingdom: Plantae
- Clade: Tracheophytes
- Clade: Angiosperms
- Clade: Eudicots
- Clade: Rosids
- Order: Vitales
- Family: Vitaceae
- Genus: Vitis
- Species: V. xunyangensis

Binomial name
- Vitis xunyangensis P.C.He

Species of grapevine

Vitis xunyangensis is an Old World species of wild grape native to temperate China (Shaanxi province).
