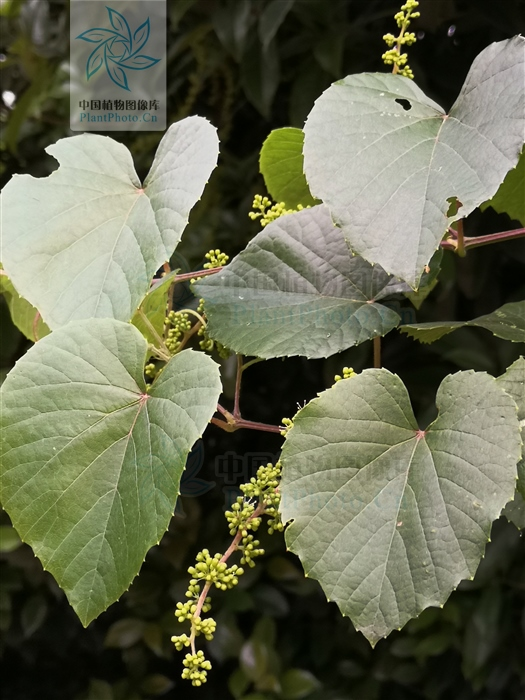
- Vine with flowers starting to bud

Scientific classification
- Kingdom: Plantae
- Clade: Tracheophytes
- Clade: Angiosperms
- Clade: Eudicots
- Clade: Rosids
- Order: Vitales
- Family: Vitaceae
- Genus: Vitis
- Species: V. pseudoreticulata

Binomial name
- Vitis pseudoreticulata W.T. Wang (1979)

= Vitis pseudoreticulata =

Species of grapevine

Vitis pseudoreticulata, commonly known as the wild Chinese grape or eastern Chinese grape, is a Chinese liana (woody vine) in the grape family. It is native to eastern China, specifically the provinces of Anhui, Fujian, Guangdong, Guangxi, Henan, Hubei, Hunan, Jiangsu, Jiangxi, and Zhejiang. The plant grows at altitudes of 100–300 m (330–980 ft) and bears medium-sized purplish-black grapes. It has been observed to be resistant to damage from moisture, white rot, anthracnose, and Downy mildew.

== Gallery ==
https://commons.wikimedia.org/wiki/File:V._pseudoreticulata_2.jpg https://commons.wikimedia.org/wiki/File:V._pseudoreticulata_3.jpg https://commons.wikimedia.org/wiki/File:V._pseudoreticulata_4.jpg https://commons.wikimedia.org/wiki/File:V._pseudoreticulata_5.jpg
