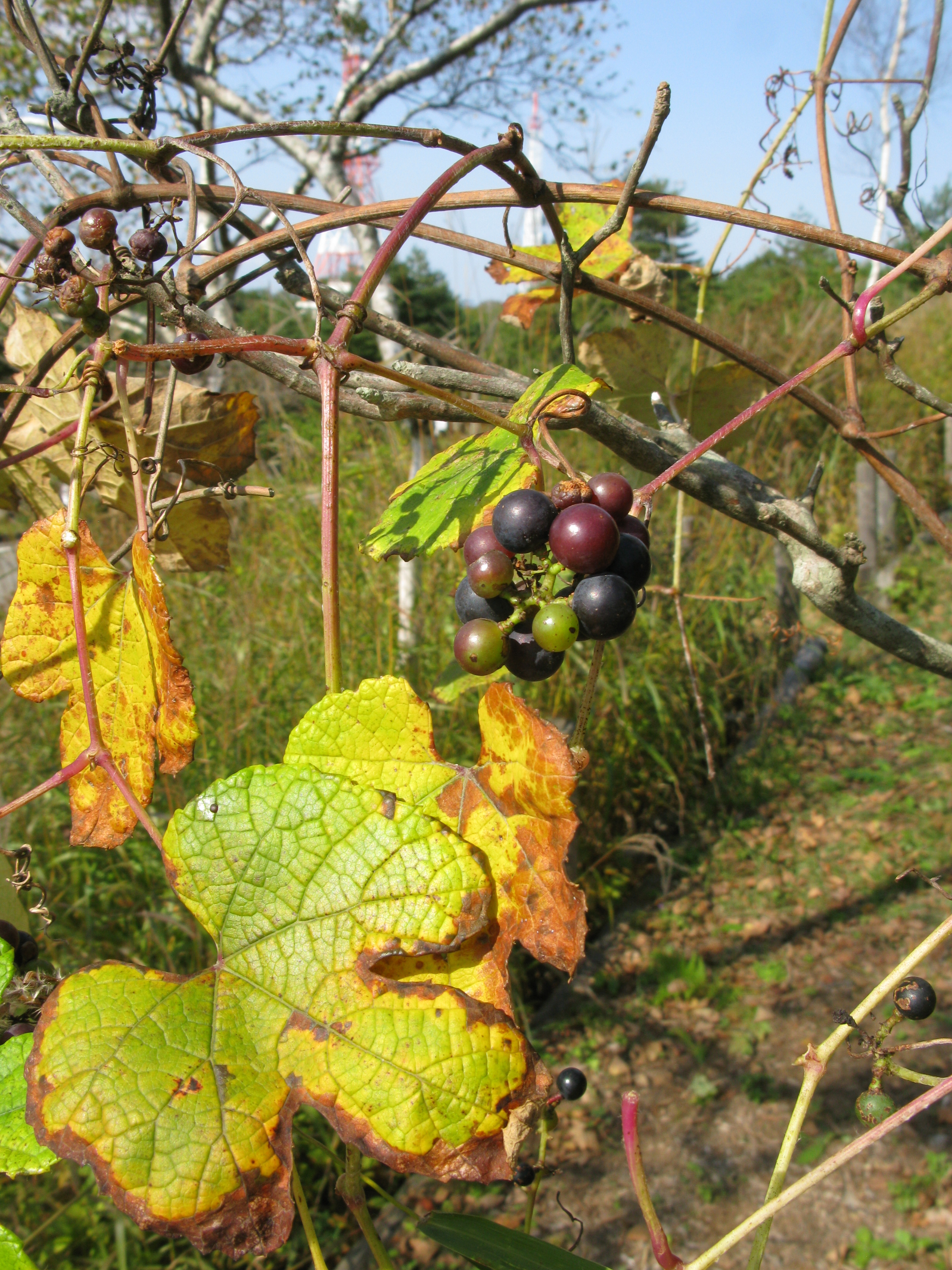

Scientific classification
- Kingdom: Plantae
- Clade: Tracheophytes
- Clade: Angiosperms
- Clade: Eudicots
- Clade: Rosids
- Order: Vitales
- Family: Vitaceae
- Genus: Vitis
- Species: V. ficifolia

Binomial name
- Vitis ficifolia Bunge

Synonyms
- V. kaempferi K.Koch; V. thunbergii Siebold & Zucc. (Poss.) V. heyneana subsp. ficifolia (Bunge) C.L.Li List source

= Vitis ficifolia =

Species of grapevine

Vitis ficifolia is a species of liana in the grape family native to the Asian temperate climate zone. It is found in mainland China (Hebei, Henan, Jiangsu, Shaanxi, Shandong and Shanxi provinces), Japan (prefectures of Hokkaido, Honshu, Kyushu, Shikoku and Ryukyu Islands), Taiwan and the Koreas.
