= Vitis balansana =

Scientific classification
- Kingdom: Plantae
- Clade: Tracheophytes
- Clade: Angiosperms
- Clade: Eudicots
- Clade: Rosids
- Order: Vitales
- Family: Vitaceae
- Genus: Vitis
- Species: V. balansana

Binomial name
- Vitis balansana Planch.

Varieties
- V. b. var. balansana V. b. var. ficifolioides (W.T.Wang) C.L.Li [ synon. = V. ficifolioides W.T.Wang ](basionym); V. b. var. tomentosa C.L.Li

Species of grapevine

Vitis balansana is a species of climbing vine in the grape family native to temperate and tropical Asia. Its native range encompasses Vietnam and three southeastern provinces in China (Guangdong, Guangxi and the island of Hainan) The habitat of V. balansana varies; it has adapted to living under forest cover, and in sun-soaked shrubland valleys, at between 200 and 800 meters.

== Varieties ==
V. b. var. balansana, the type for this species, is the only variety known from Guangdong and Hainan provinces or from Vietnam, the other two are both native to Guangxi, and may not be known from elsewhere.

Each variety is known by its own distinct name in Chinese:

- Vitis balansana var. balansana is known as xiao guo pu tao, or fruitlet grape;
- Vitis balansana var. tomentosa is known by the same name, but with an additional prefix, i.e. rong mao xiao guo pu tao, or downy fruitlet grape;
- Vitis balansana var. ficifolioides is known as long zhou pu tao, or Longzhou [Dragon state] grape, from the County of Longzhou in Guangxi, on the Sino-Vietnam border.
