= Vitis acerifolia =

Maple-Leaf grape

Conservation status
- Apparently Secure (NatureServe)

Scientific classification
- Kingdom: Plantae
- Clade: Embryophytes
- Clade: Tracheophytes
- Clade: Angiosperms
- Clade: Eudicots
- Clade: Rosids
- Order: Vitales
- Family: Vitaceae
- Genus: Vitis
- Species: V. acerifolia

Binomial name
- Vitis acerifolia Raf.

Synonyms
- Vitis longii W.R. Prince & Prince

Species of flowering plant in the grape family

Vitis acerifolia is a species of grape native to the south-central part of the Great Plains of the United States (Kansas, Oklahoma, northern Texas, eastern Colorado, and northeastern New Mexico). Its leaf shape is the origin of its name, which is Latin for maple-leaf grape, but it is widely referenced in literature by the synonym, Vitis longii.

== Cultivation and uses ==
Vitis acerifolia provides many potential benefits for the breeding of hybrid grapes. Vitis acerifolia is second in cold-hardiness among grapes only to Vitis riparia. Unlike other cold hardy grapes, it will grow long into fall if weather is clement, but can harden off remarkably fast in a cold snap. This makes it ideally suited for North American winter weather which often include sudden fluctuations in temperature, and is superior in this regard to its rival for second place in cold hardiness among grapes, Vitis amurensis, which is notorious for coming out of hibernation during a warm spell only to be damaged by a sudden frost. Aside from cold hardiness, it strongly resists drought, is resistant to phylloxera, is easy to root, has seeds that germinate all at once and it has good to excellent general resistance to other common grape diseases.

Vitis acerifolia yields strongly colored juice. While berries and clusters are generally small and seedy, it lacks the 'off flavors' of many other North American Vitis species, having neither the harsh labrusca aftertaste nor the characteristic herbaceous flavor of Vitis riparia, nor the blackcurrant-like flavor common to post oak grapes or the harsh peppery taste of many other native Texas grapes. Low acidity and very early ripening are also important characteristics for potential grape breeders.

One varietal that owes its parentage to Vitis acerifolia is the Canadian variety 'Vincent'. This varietal seems to have more anthocyanin than other grape cultivars. Since red wines are fermented on the skins and this is the source of 'off' flavors in hybrid wines, it is notoriously difficult to produce cold hardy, quality red wine grape varieties. There are even fewer capable of adding strong coloration to weaker-colored juice varieties. Vitis acerifolia hybrids show much promise in this area.

Although it has no inherent resistance to Pierce's disease, it seldom suffers from this disease due to being almost totally unpalatable to the common insect vector of the disease, the glassy-winged sharpshooter (Homalodisca vitripennis). This is apparently due to the pubescence of the leaves repelling the insect.
