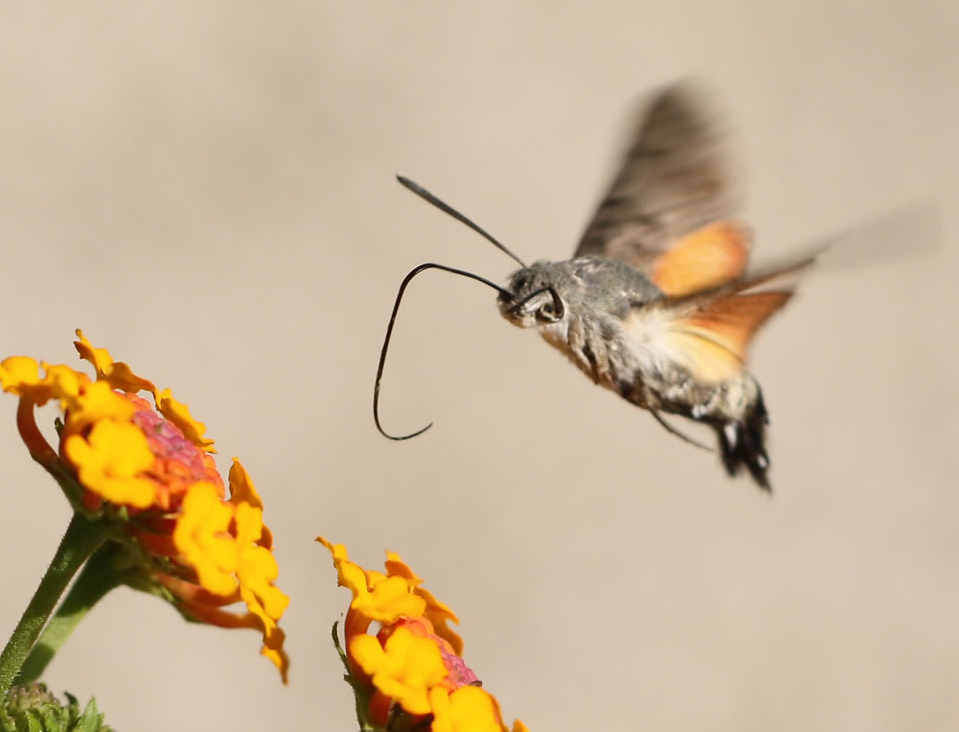
- Macroglossum stellatarum

Scientific classification
- Domain: Eukaryota
- Kingdom: Animalia
- Phylum: Arthropoda
- Class: Insecta
- Order: Lepidoptera
- Family: Sphingidae
- Subfamily: Macroglossinae
- Tribe: Macroglossini; Harris, 1839

Genera
- See text

= Macroglossini =

Tribe of moths

Macroglossini is a tribe of moths of the family Sphingidae described by Thaddeus William Harris in 1839.

== Taxonomy ==
- Subtribe Choerocampina Grote & Robinson, 1865
  - Genus Basiothia Walker, 1856
  - Genus Cechenena Rothschild & Jordan, 1903
  - Genus Centroctena Rothschild & Jordan, 1903
  - Genus Chaerocina Rothschild & Jordan, 1903
  - Genus Deilephila Laspeyres, 1809
  - Genus Euchloron Boisduval, 1875
  - Genus Griseosphinx Cadiou & Kitching, 1990
  - Genus Hippotion Hübner, 1819
  - Genus Hyles Hübner, 1819
  - Genus Pergesa Walker, 1856
  - Genus Phanoxyla Rothschild & Jordan, 1903
  - Genus Rhagastis Rothschild & Jordan, 1903
  - Genus Rhodafra Rothschild & Jordan, 1903
  - Genus Theretra Hübner, 1819
  - Genus Xylophanes Hübner, 1819
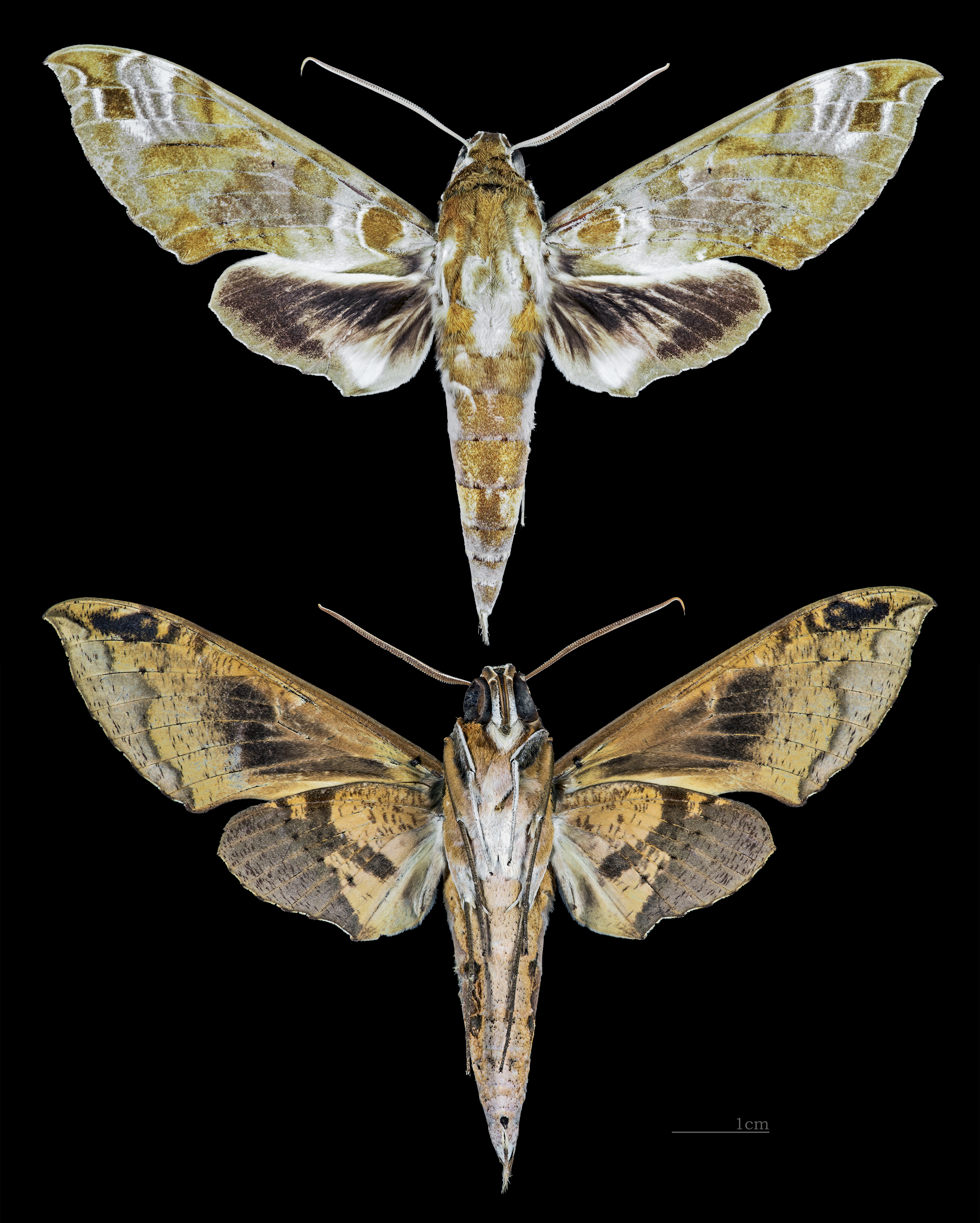
Cechenena

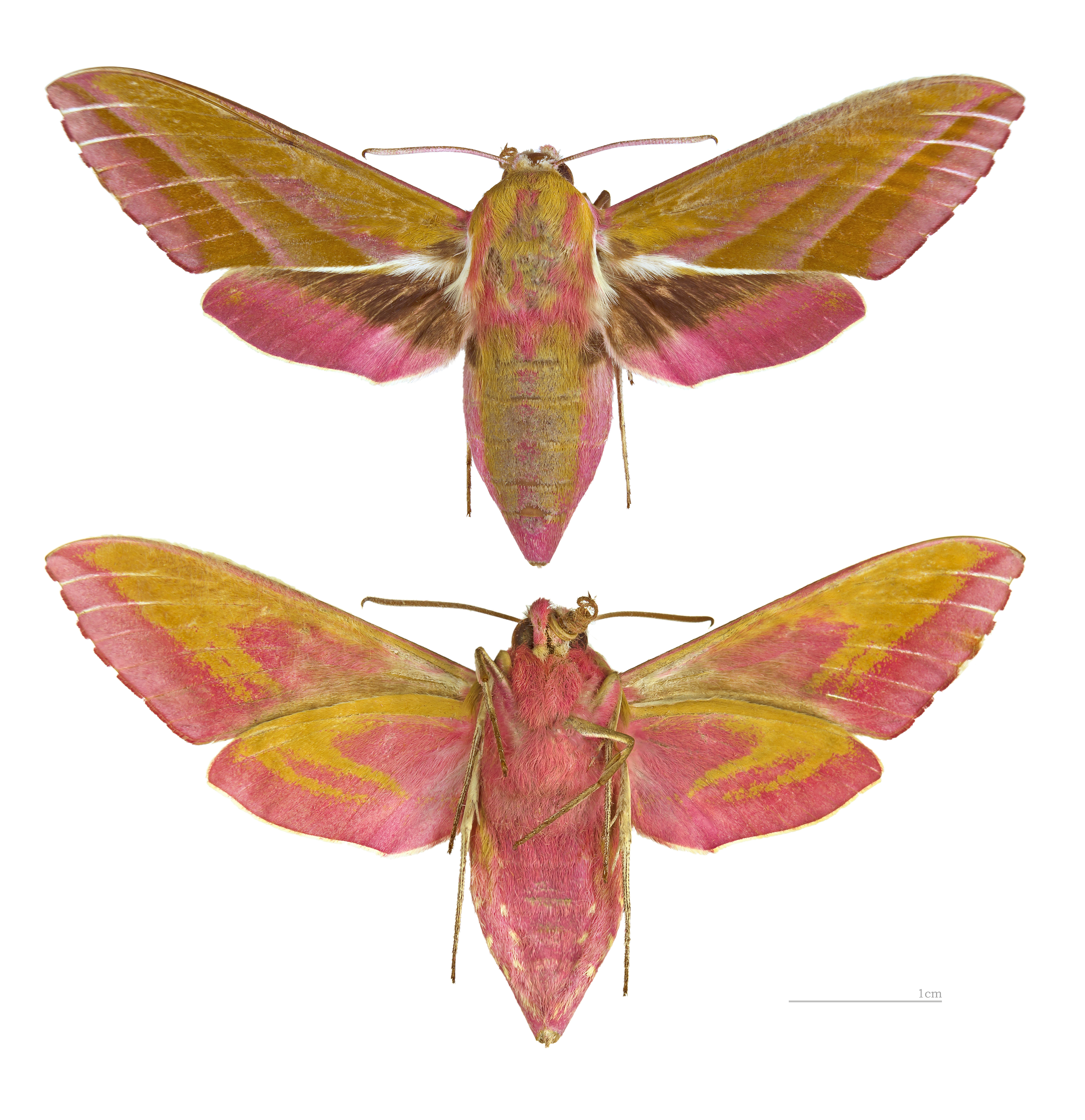
Deilephila

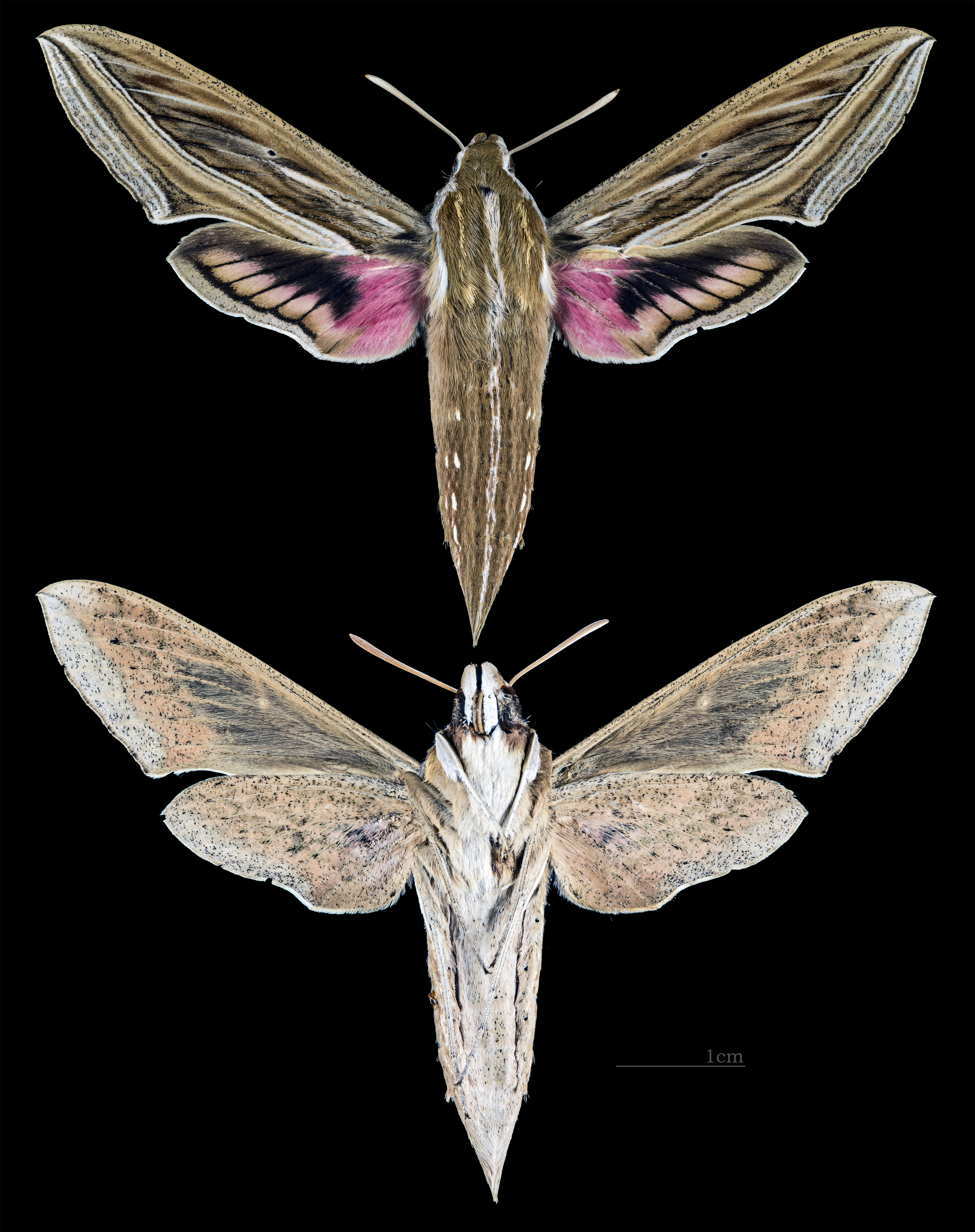
Hippotion

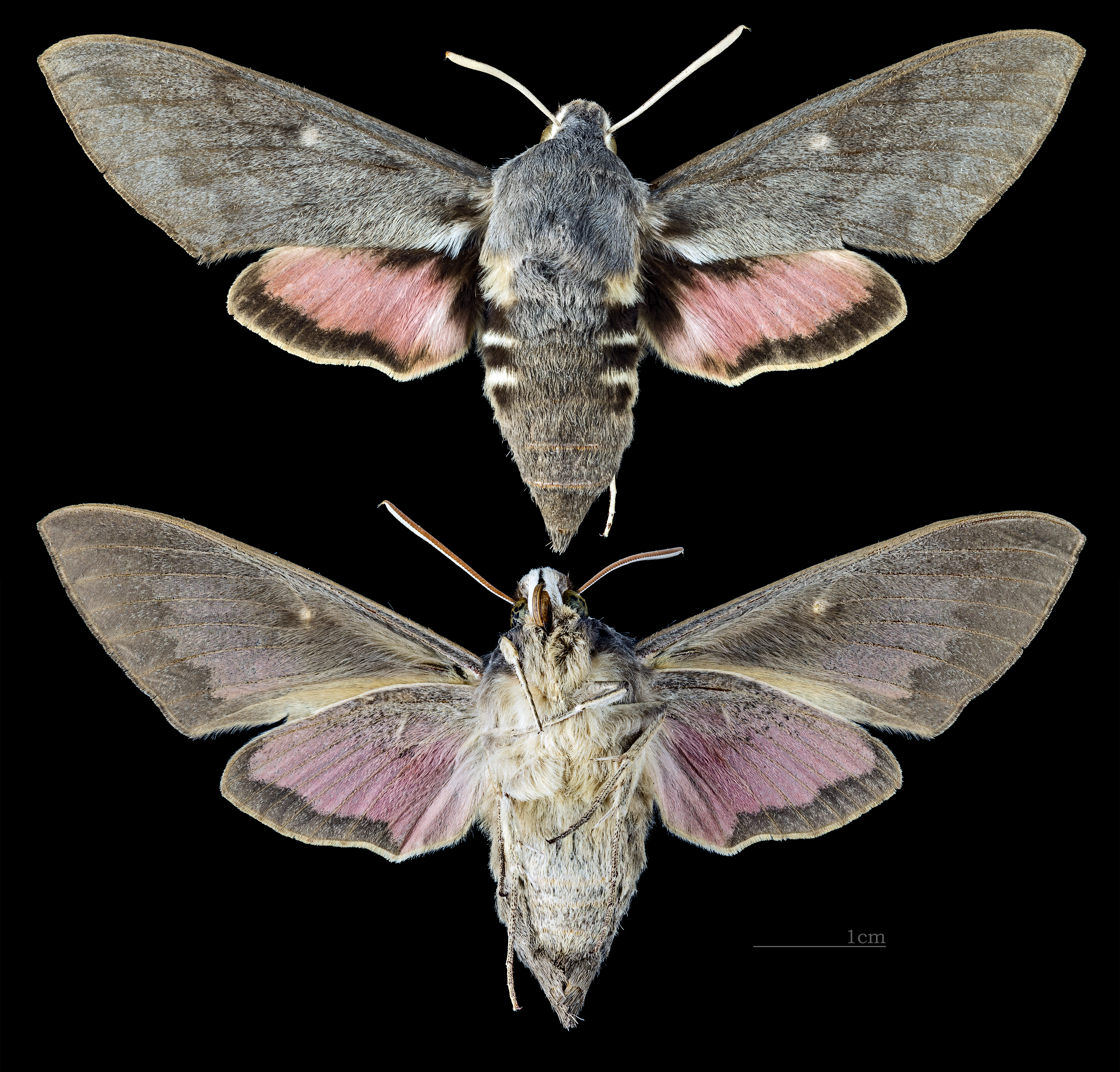
Hyles

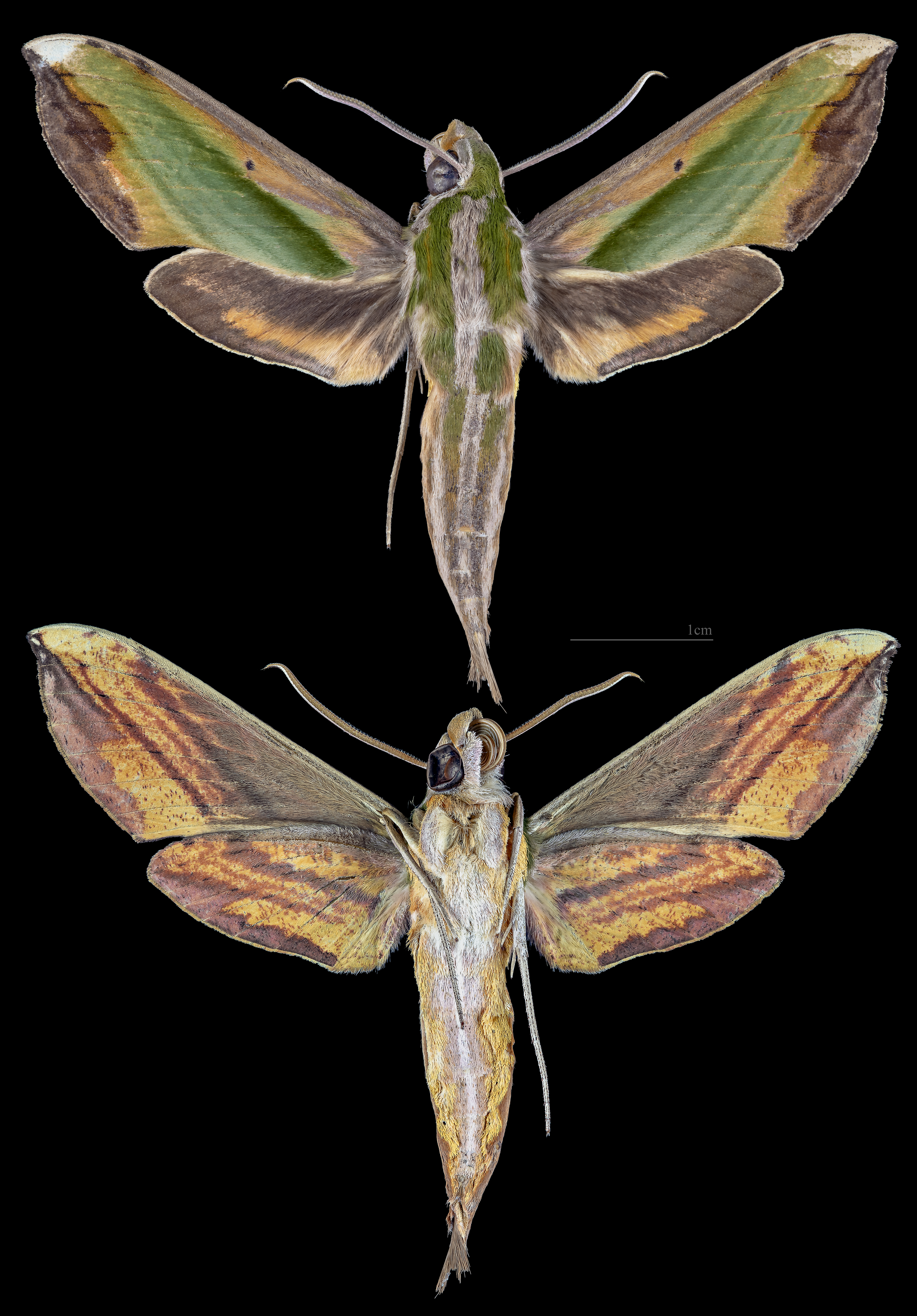
Pergesa

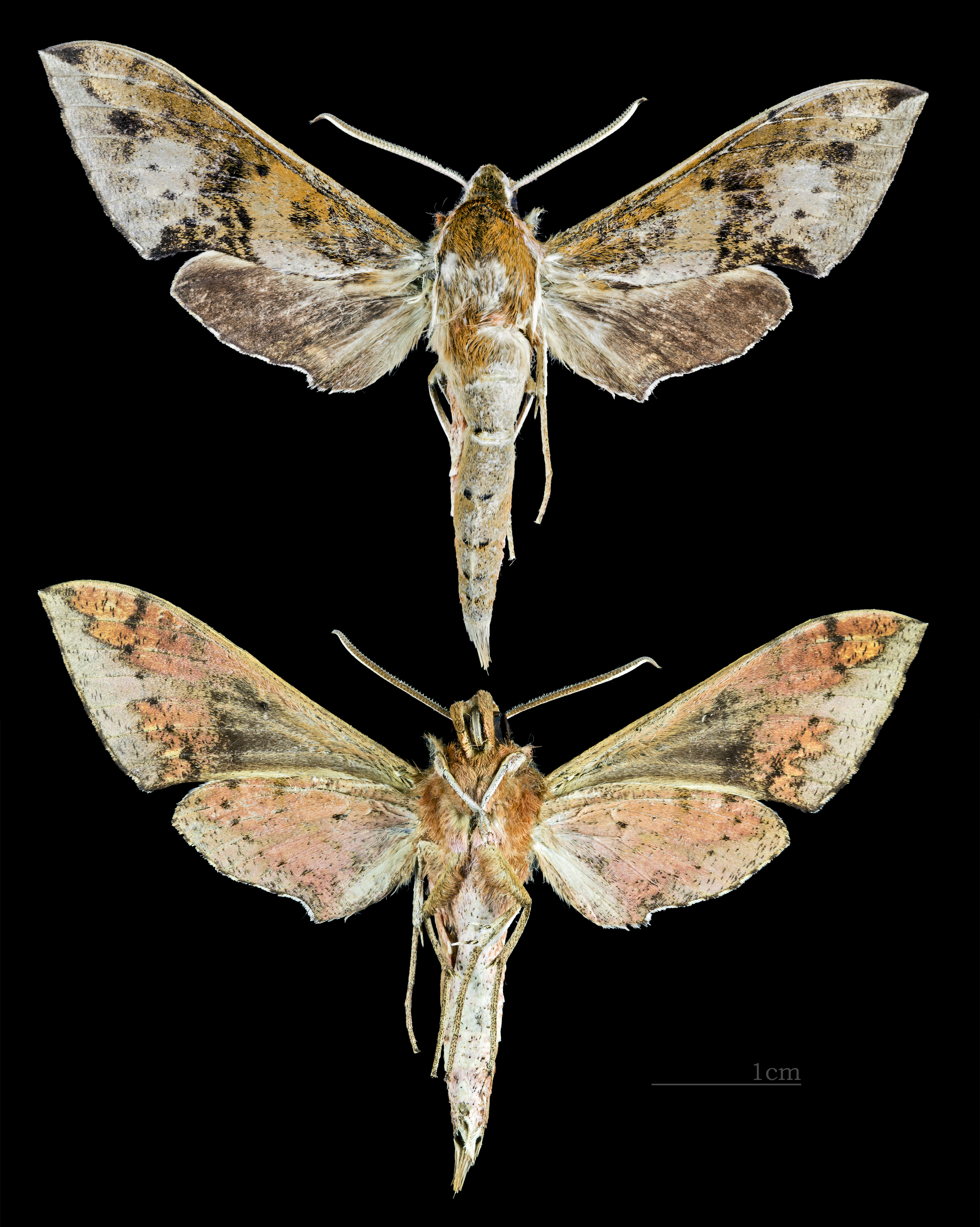
Rhagastis

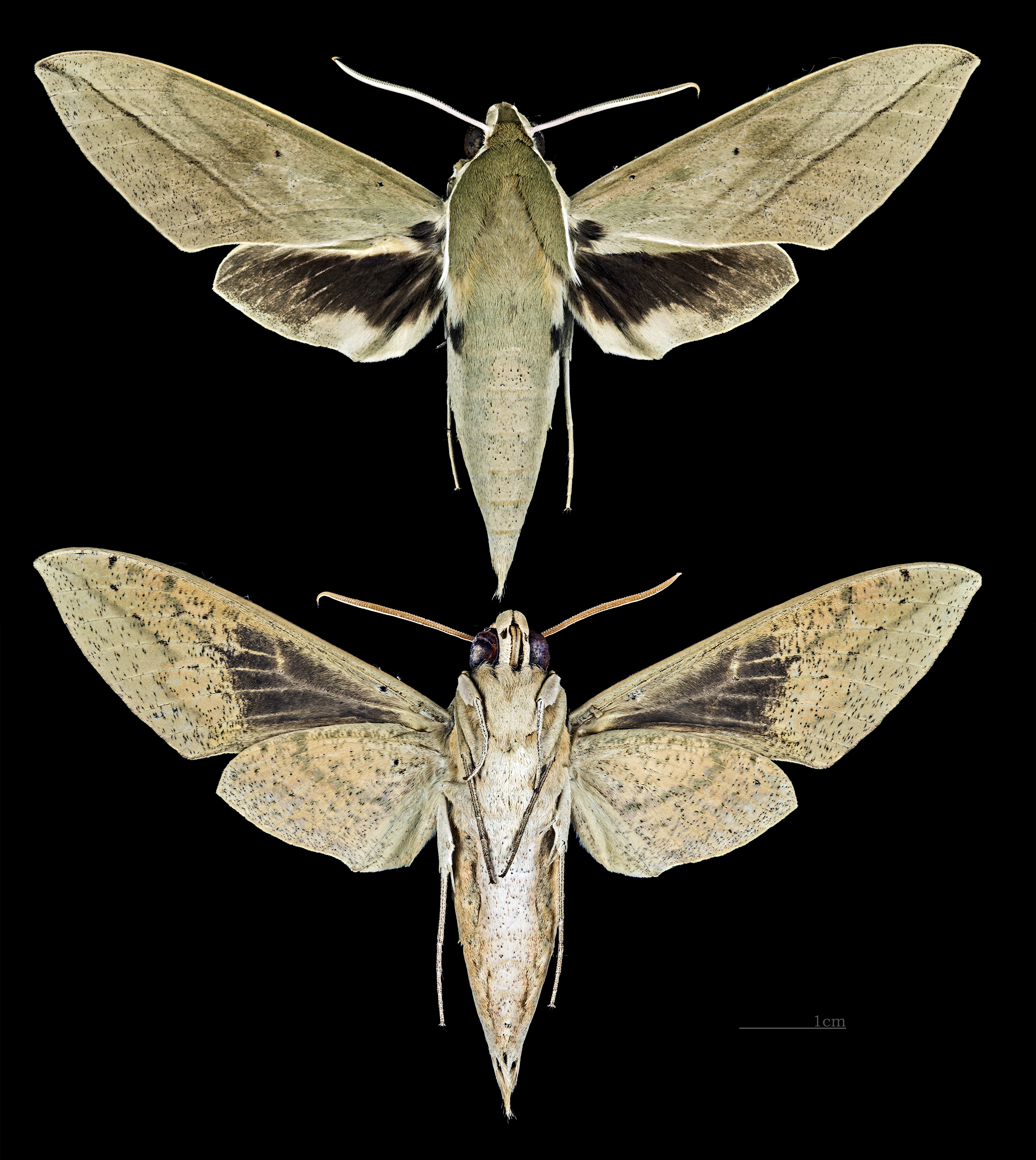
Theretra

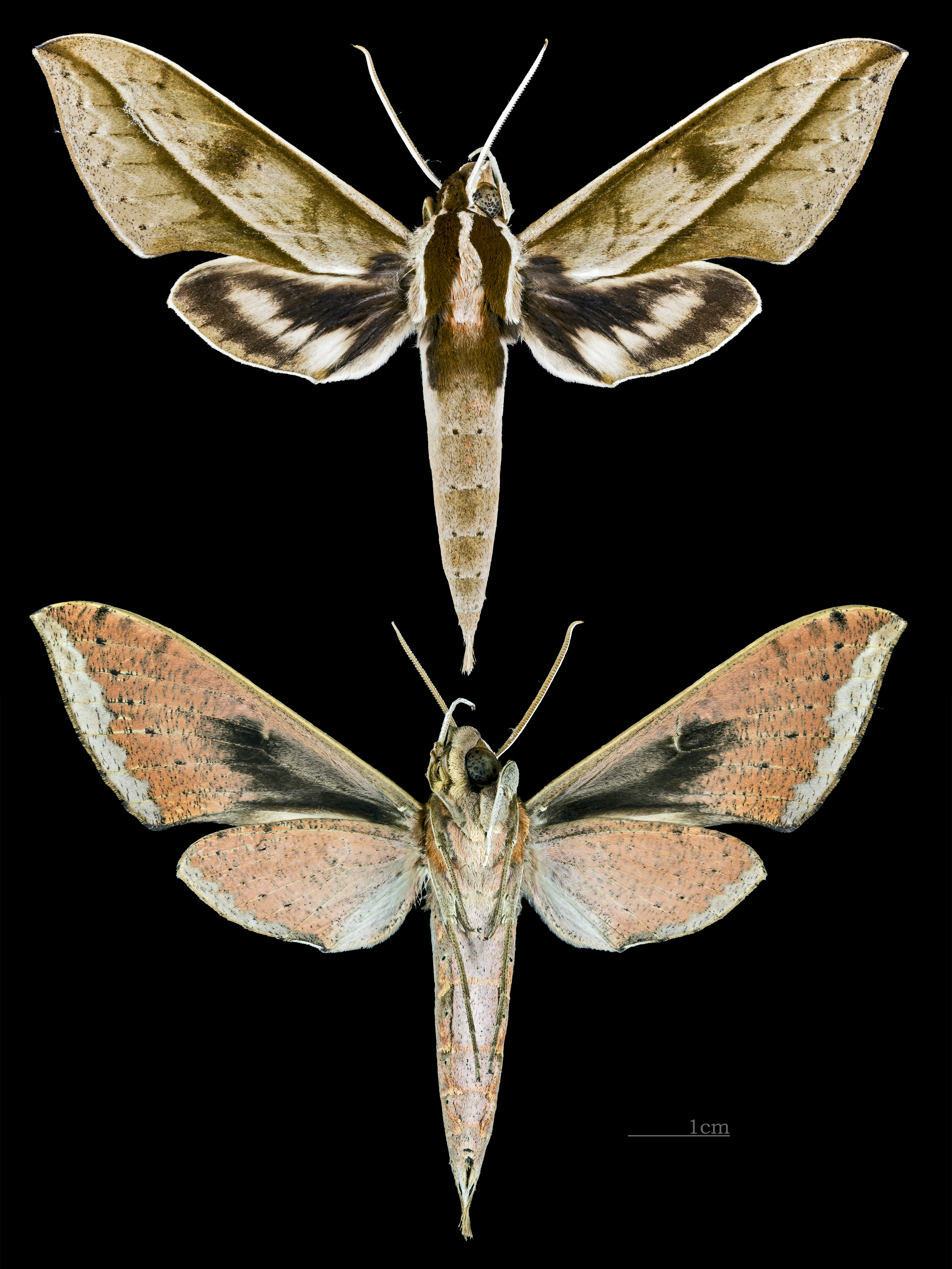
Xylophanes
- Subtribe Macroglossina Harris, 1839
  - Genus Acosmerycoides Mell, 1922
  - Genus Acosmeryx Boisduval, 1875
  - Genus Altijuba Lachlan, 1999
  - Genus Ampelophaga Bremer & Grey, 1853
  - Genus Amphion Hübner, 1819
  - Genus Angonyx Boisduval, 1874
  - Genus Antinephele Holland, 1889
  - Genus Atemnora Rothschild & Jordan, 1903
  - Genus Cizara Walker, 1856
  - Genus Clarina Tutt, 1903
  - Genus Dahira Moore, 1888
  - Genus Daphnis Hübner, 1819
  - Genus Darapsa Walker, 1856
  - Genus Deidamia Clemens, 1859
  - Genus Elibia Walker, 1856
  - Genus Enpinanga Rothschild & Jordan, 1903
  - Genus Eupanacra Cadiou & Holloway, 1989
  - Genus Euproserpinus Grote & Robinson, 1865
  - Genus Eurypteryx Felder, 1874
  - Genus Giganteopalpus Huwe, 1895
  - Genus Gnathothlibus Wallengren, 1858
  - Genus Hayesiana D. S. Fletcher, 1982
  - Genus Hypaedalea Butler, 1877
  - Genus Leucostrophus Rothschild & Jordan, 1903
  - Genus Maassenia Saalmüller, 1884
  - Genus Macroglossum Scopoli, 1777
  - Genus Micracosmeryx Mell, 1922
  - Genus Microsphinx Rothschild & Jordan, 1903
  - Genus Neogurelca Hogenes & Treadaway, 1993
  - Genus Nephele Hübner, 1819
  - Genus Odontosida Rothschild & Jordan, 1903
  - Genus Philodila Rothschild & Jordan, 1903
  - Genus Proserpinus Hübner, 1819
  - Genus Pseudenyo Holland, 1889
  - Genus Pseudoangonyx Eitschberger, 2010
  - Genus Rethera Rothschild & Jordan, 1903
  - Genus Sphecodina Blanchard, 1840
  - Genus Sphingonaepiopsis Wallengren, 1858
  - Genus Temnora Walker, 1856
  - Genus Temnoripais Rothschild & Jordan, 1903
  - Genus Zacria Haxaire & Melichar, 2003
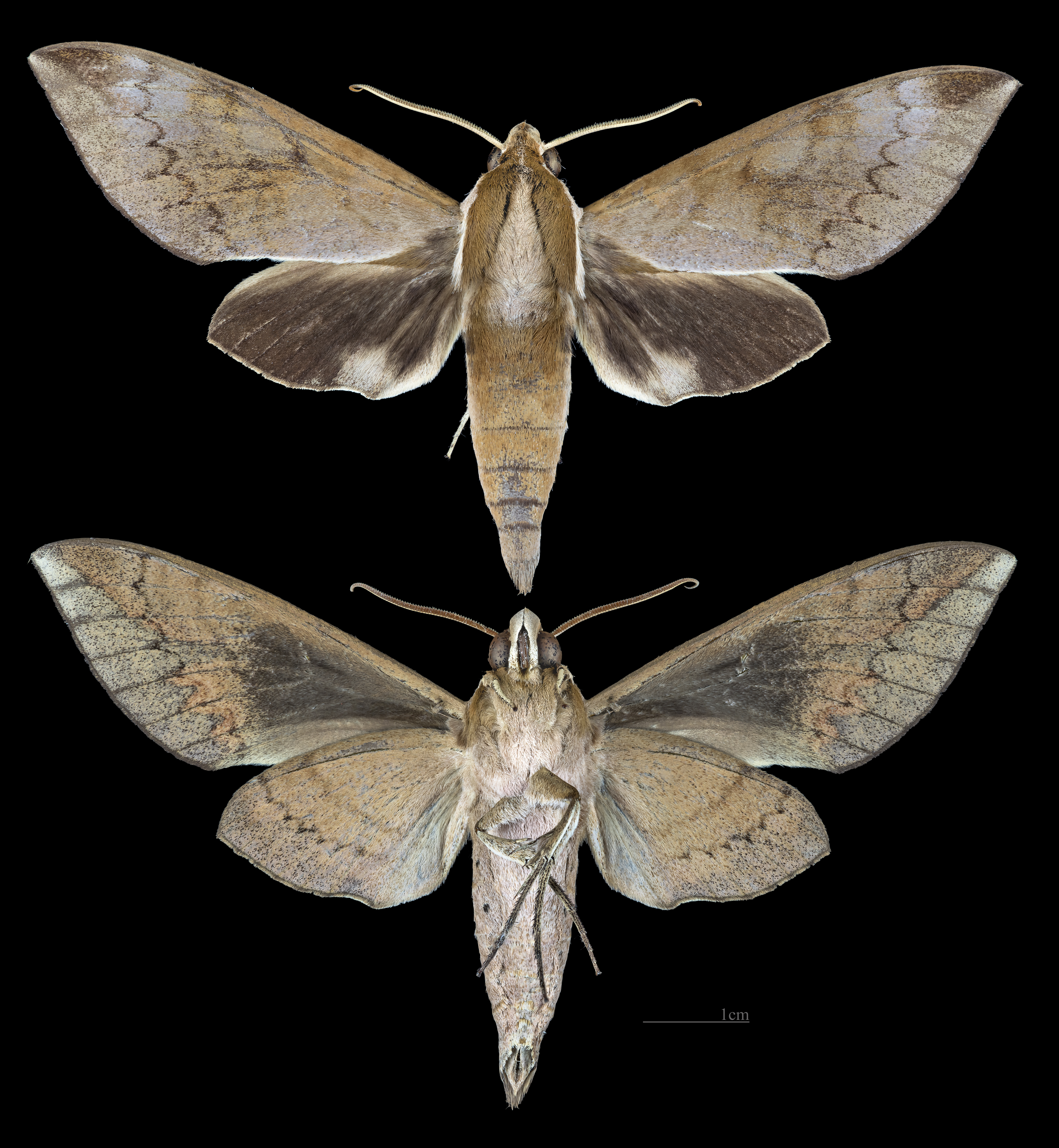
Acosmerycoides

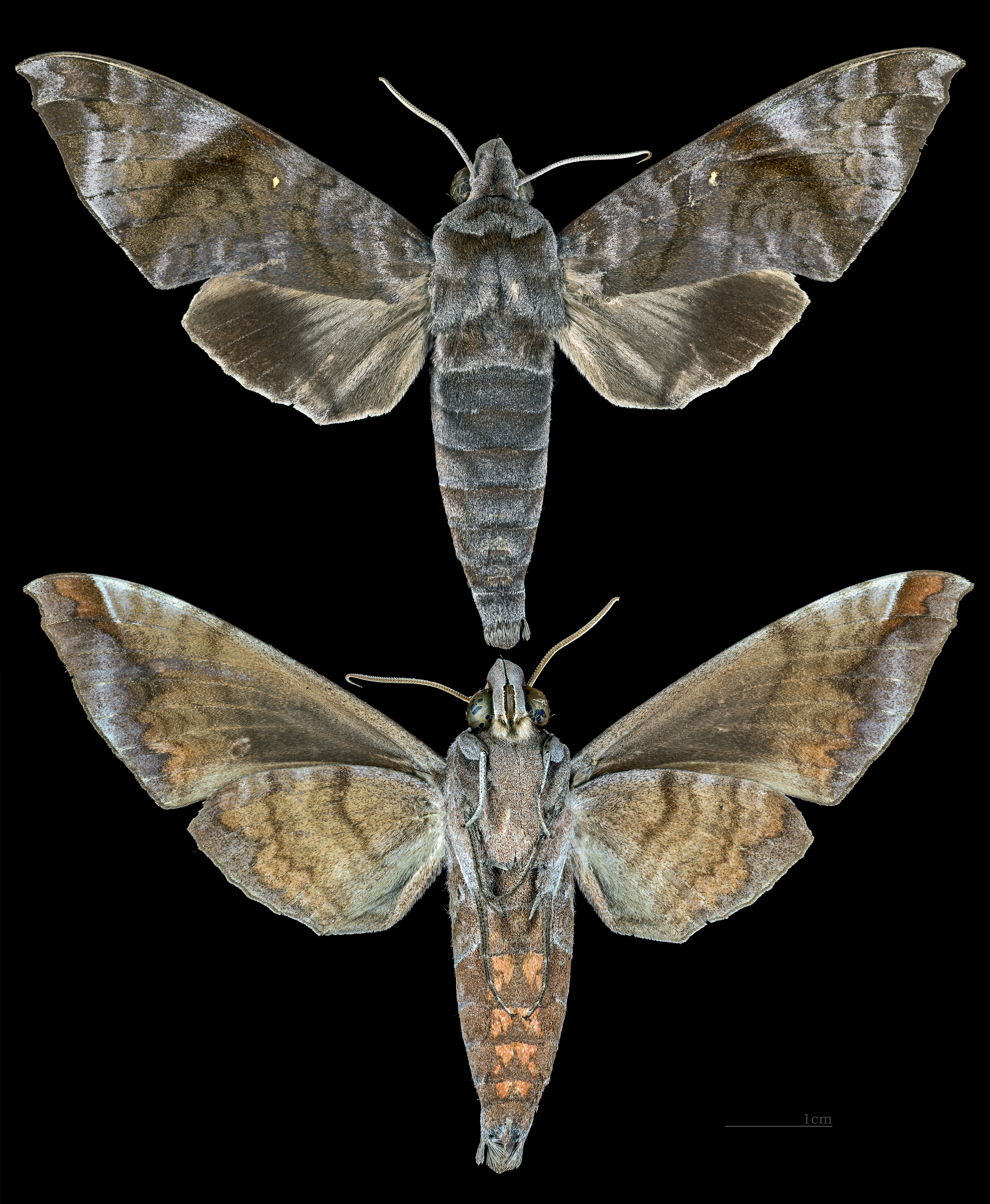
Acosmeryx

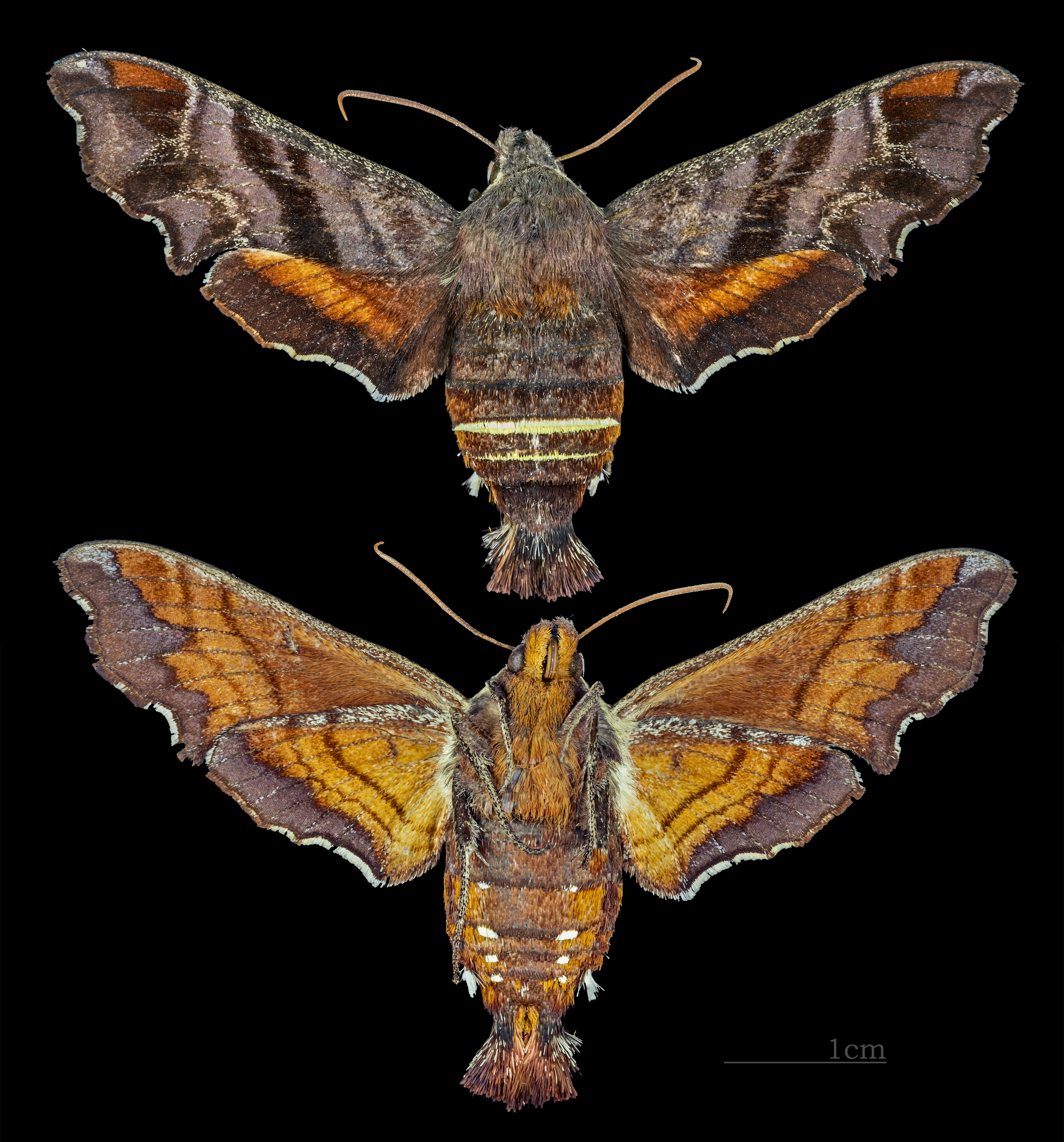
Amphion

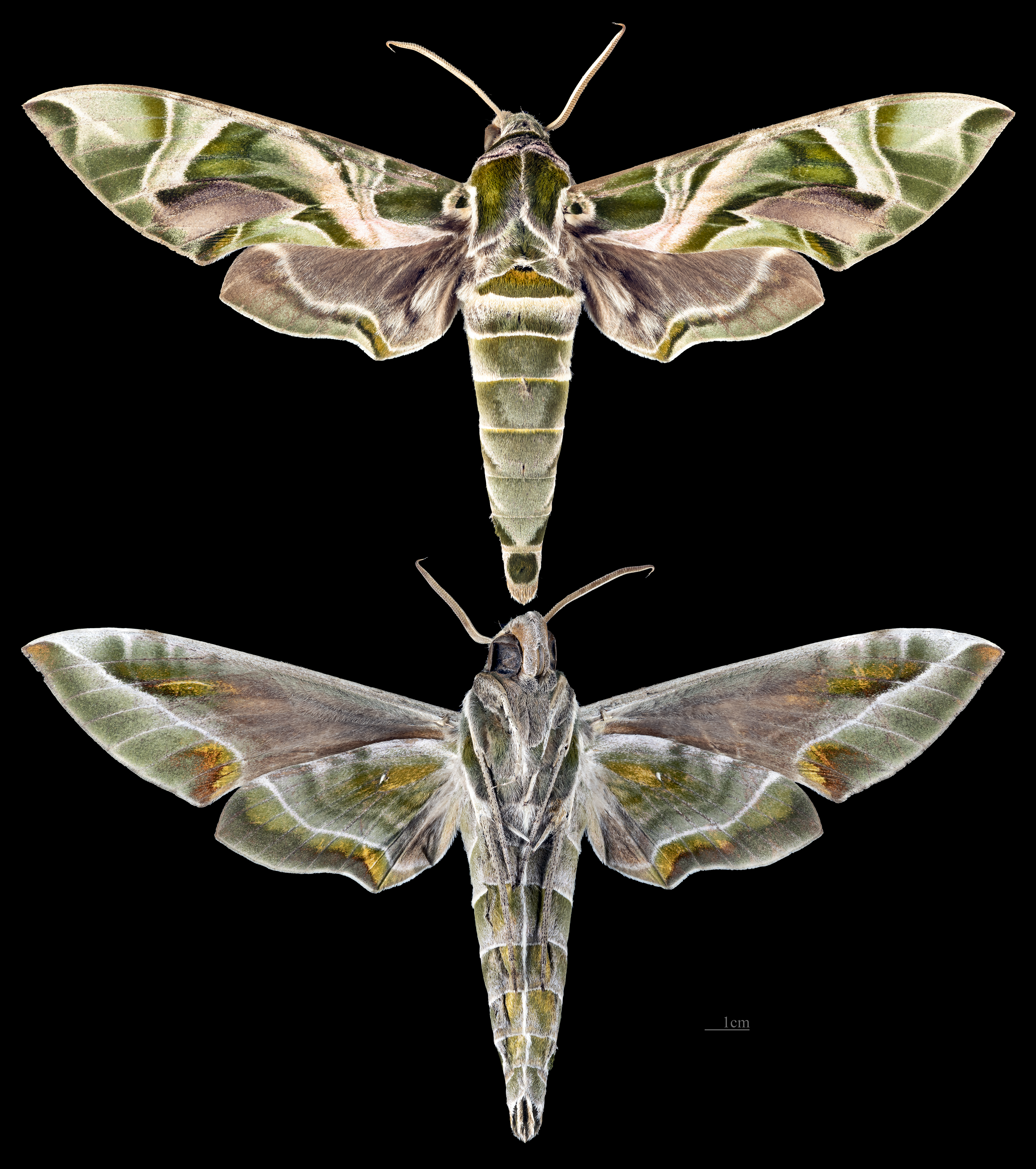
Daphnis

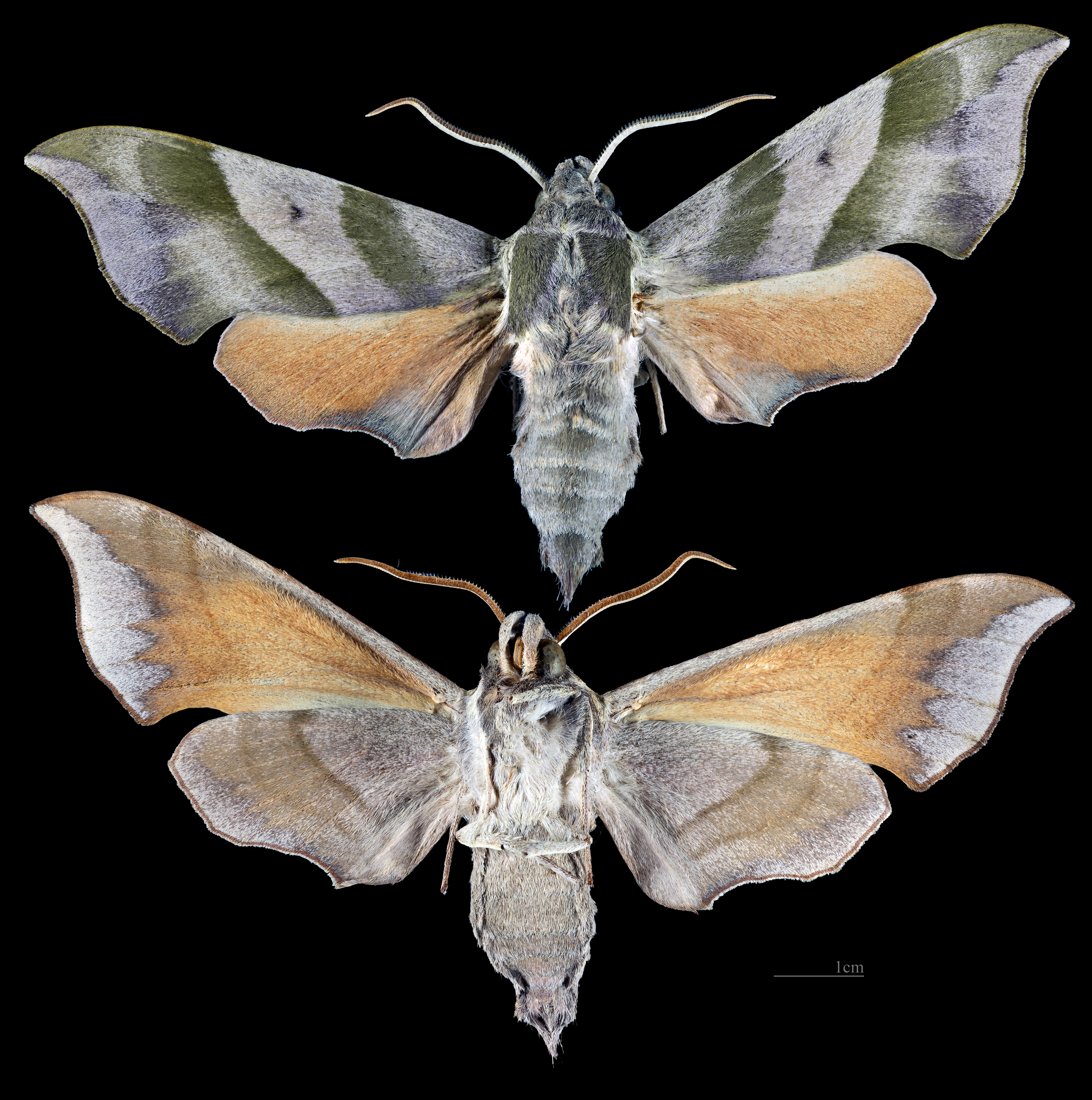
Darapsa

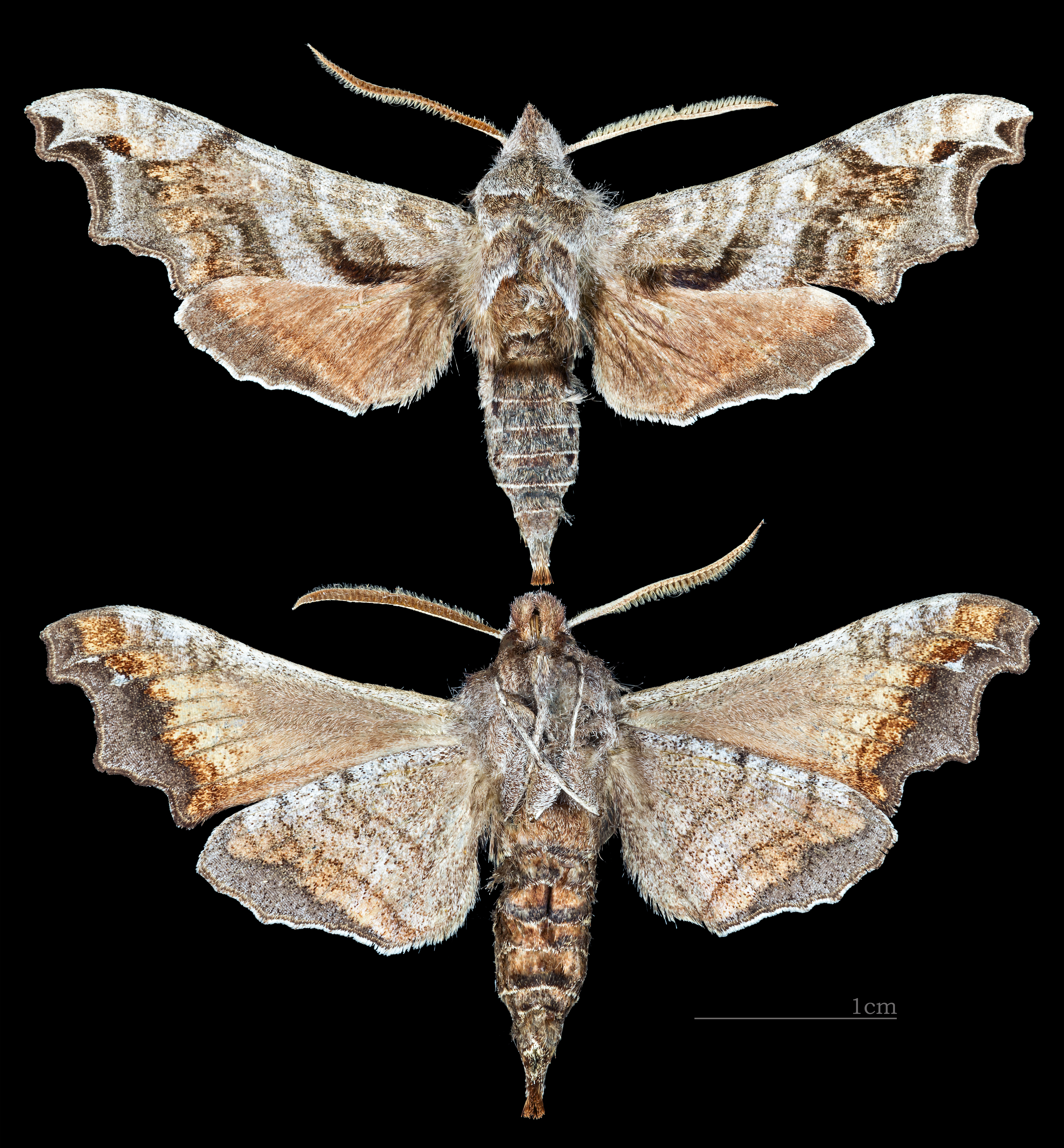
Deidamia

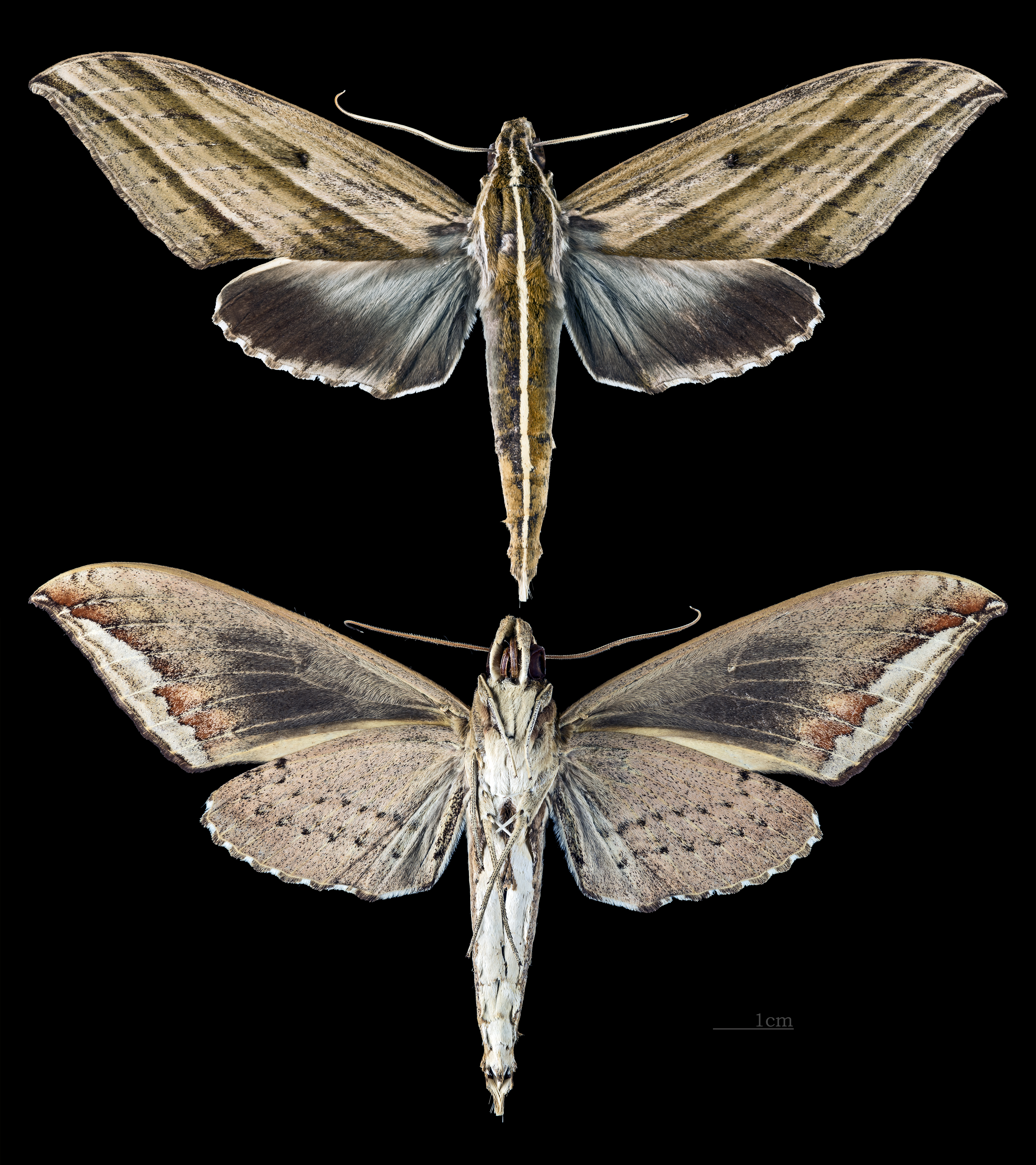
Elibia

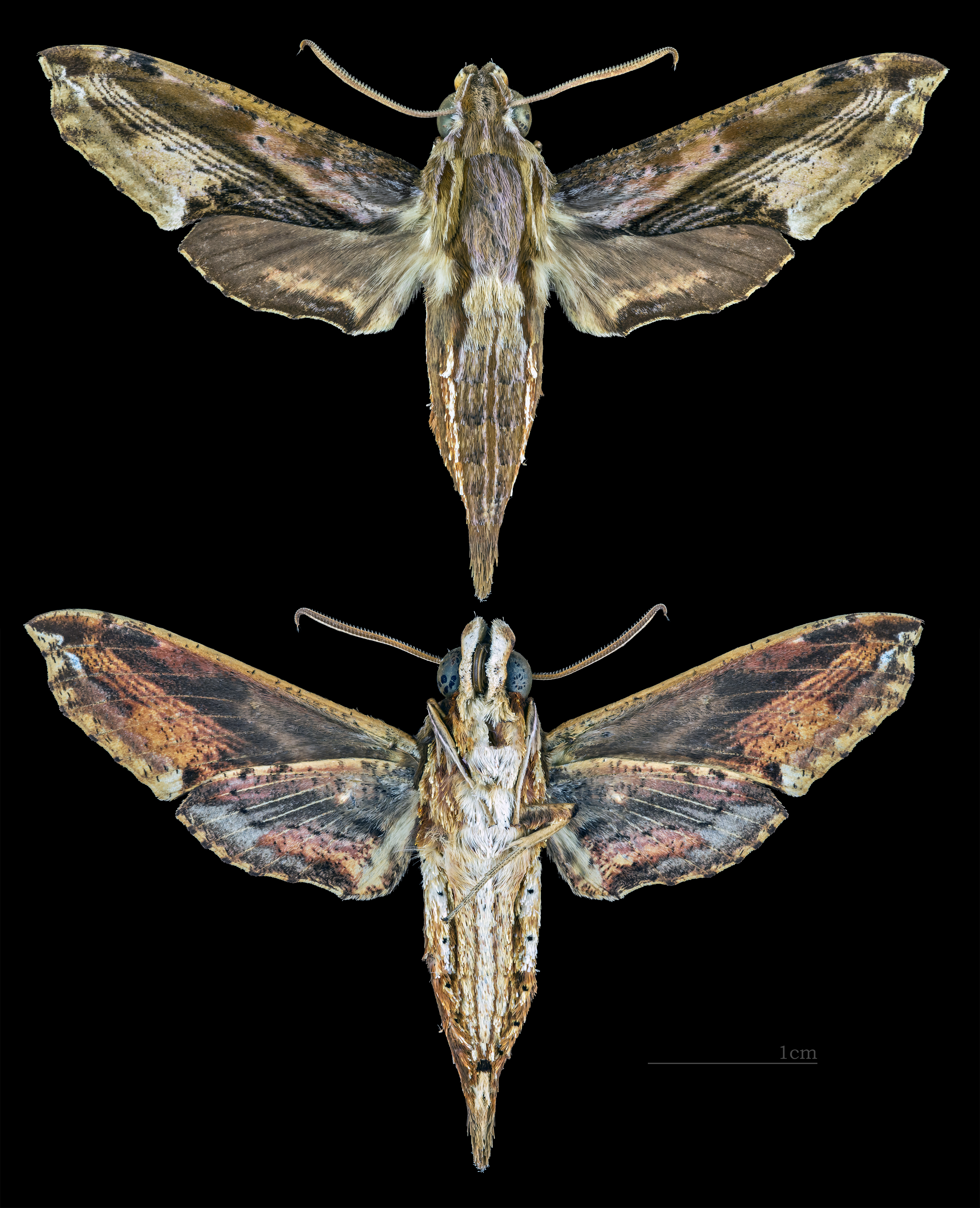
Eupanacra

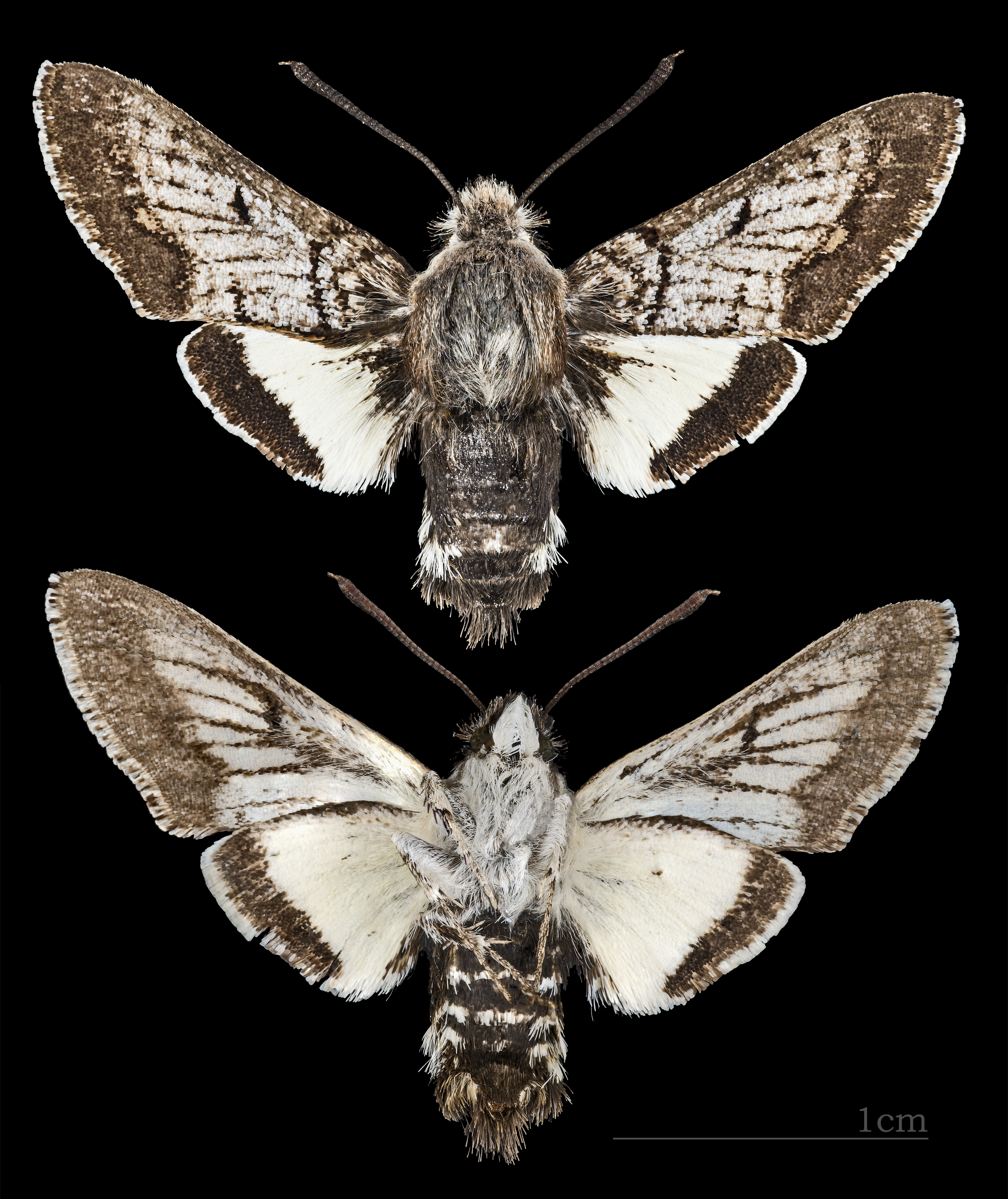
Euproserpinus

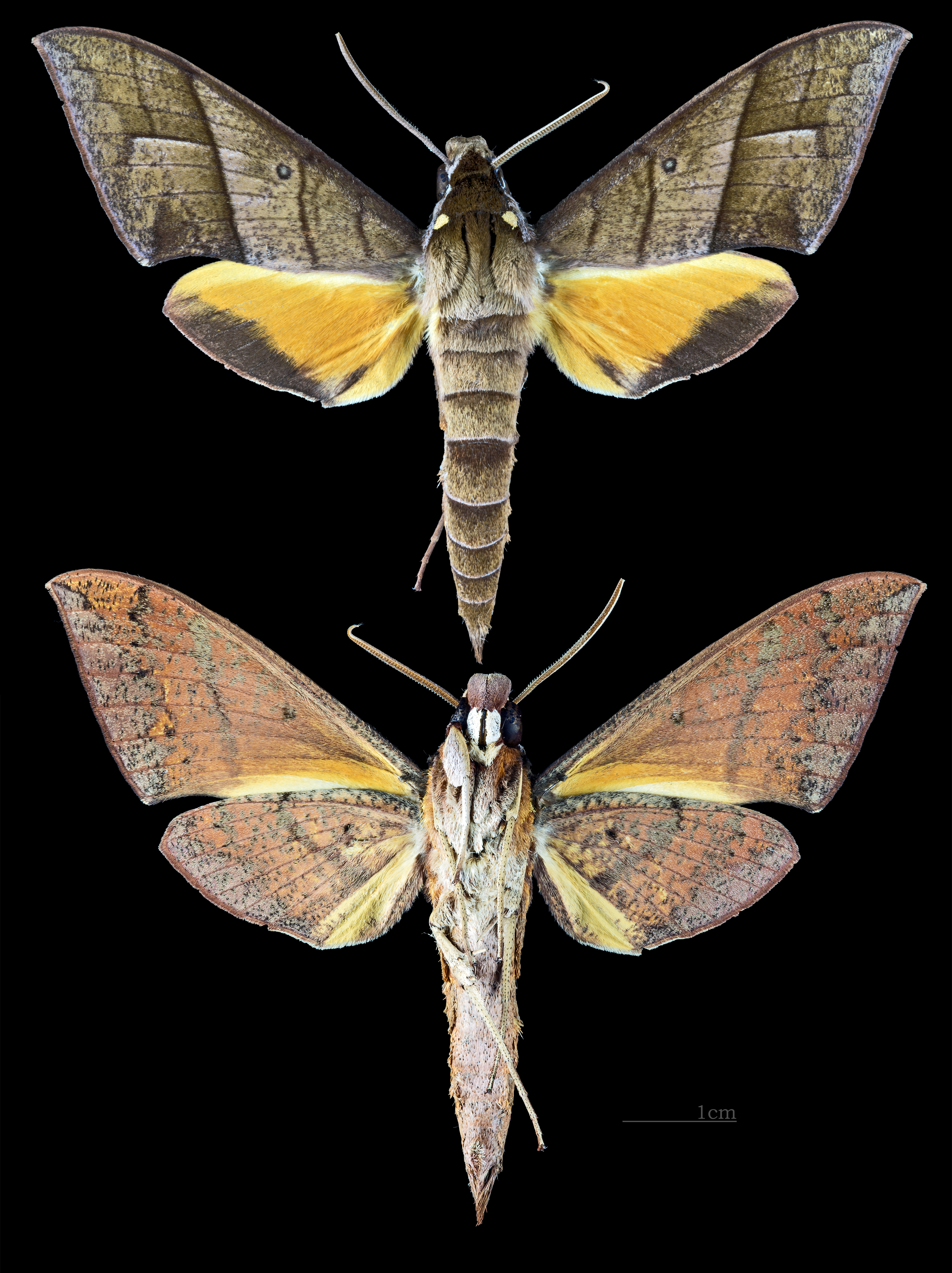
Gnathothlibus

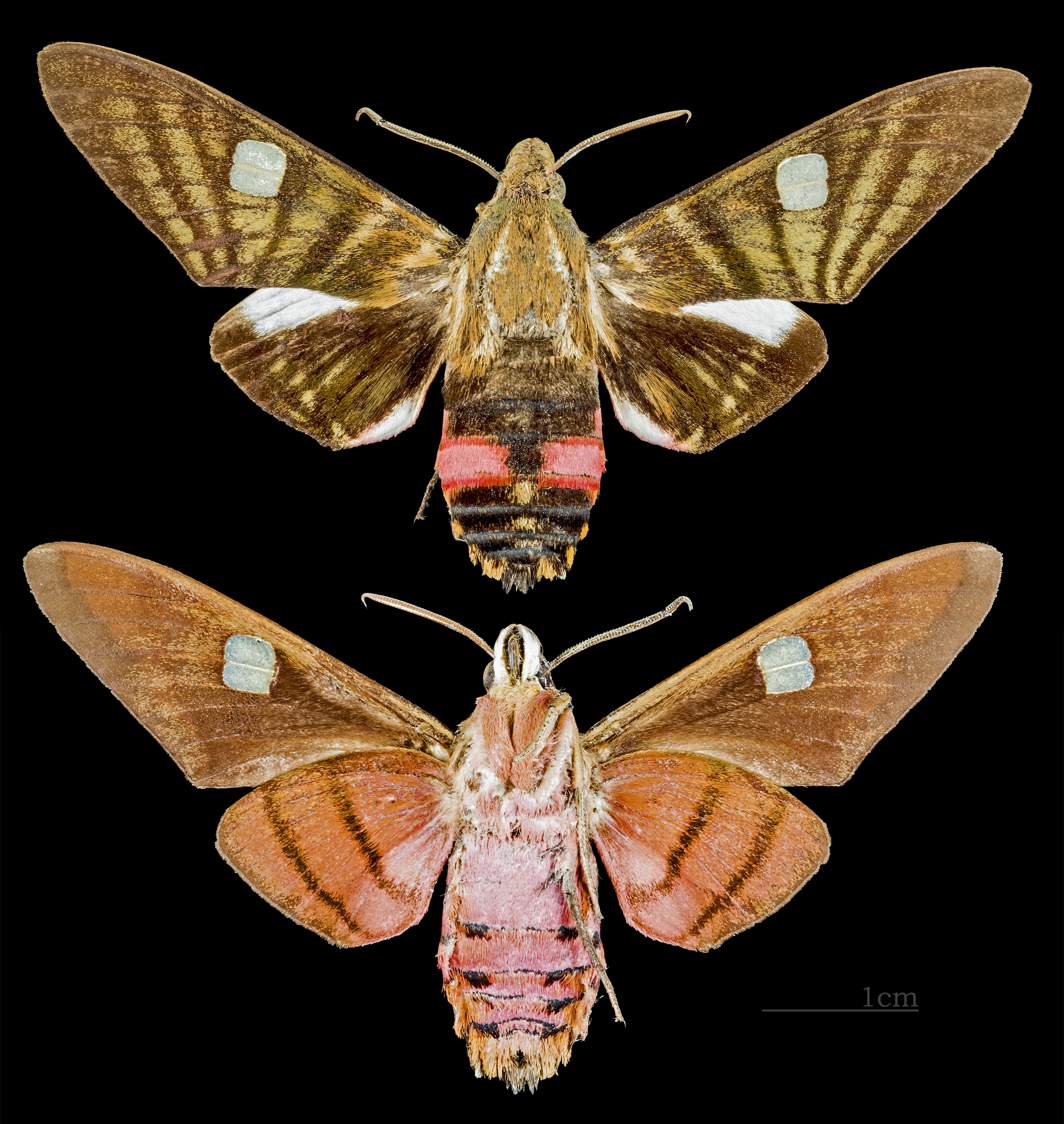
Hayesiana

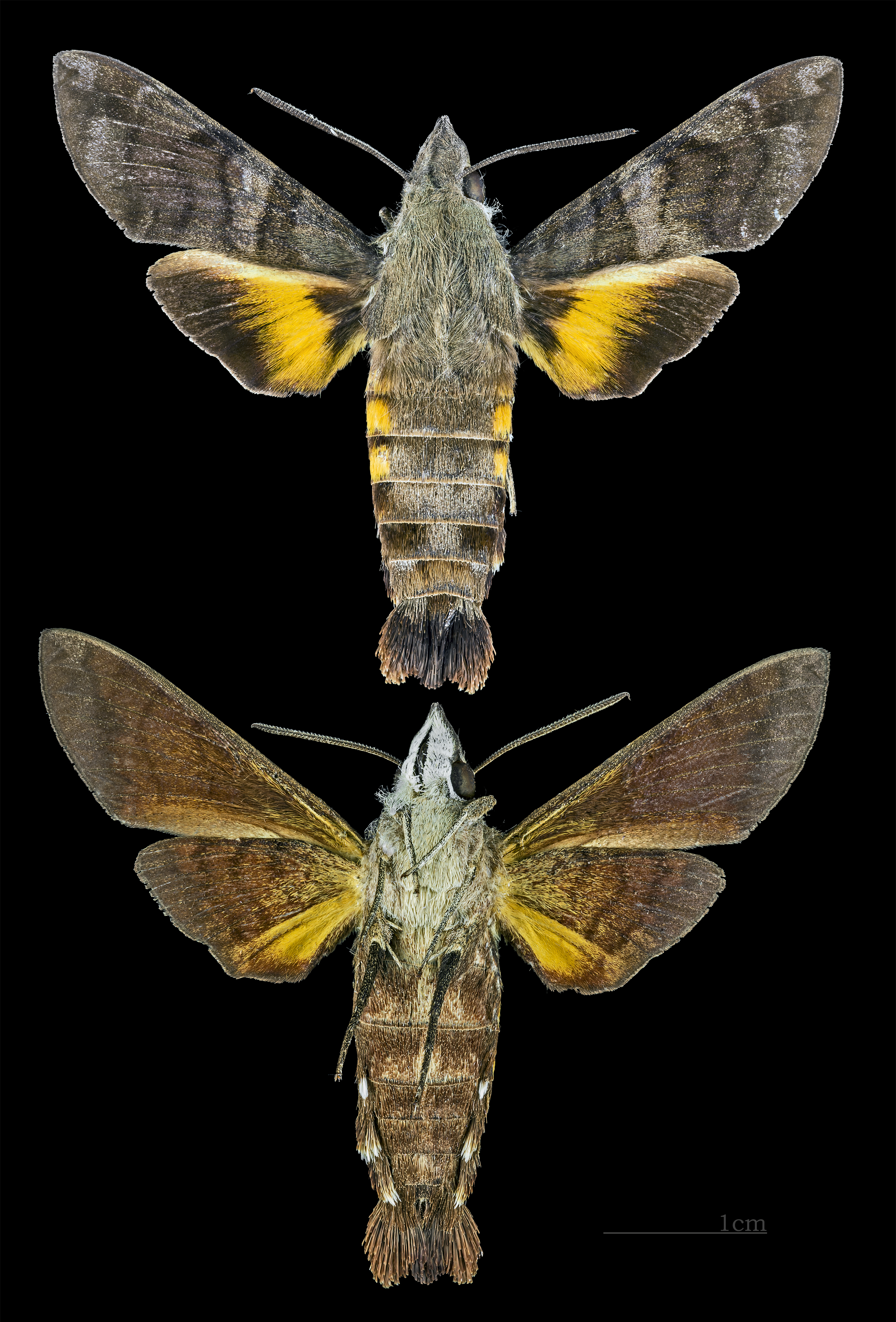
Macroglossum

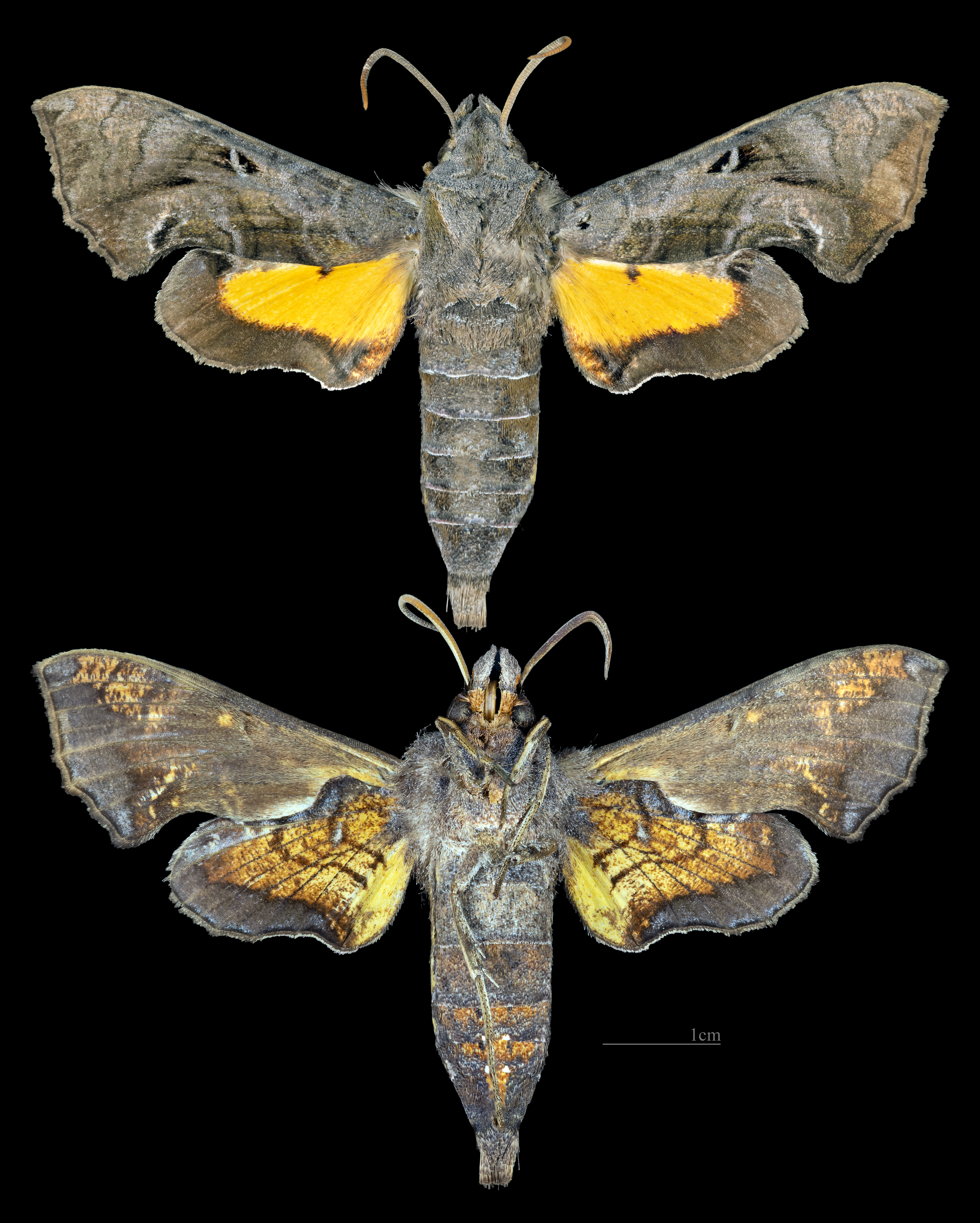
Neogurelca

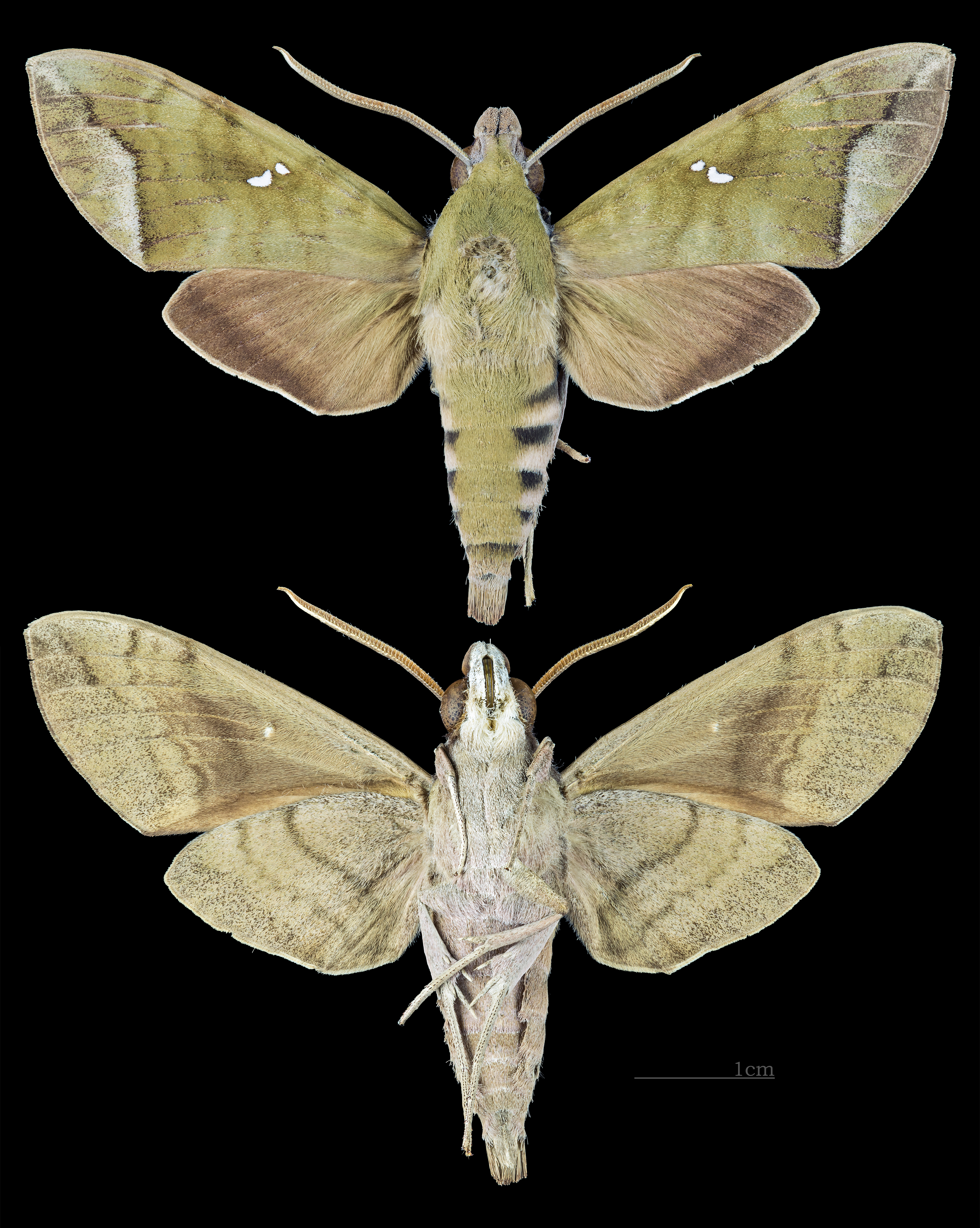
Nephele

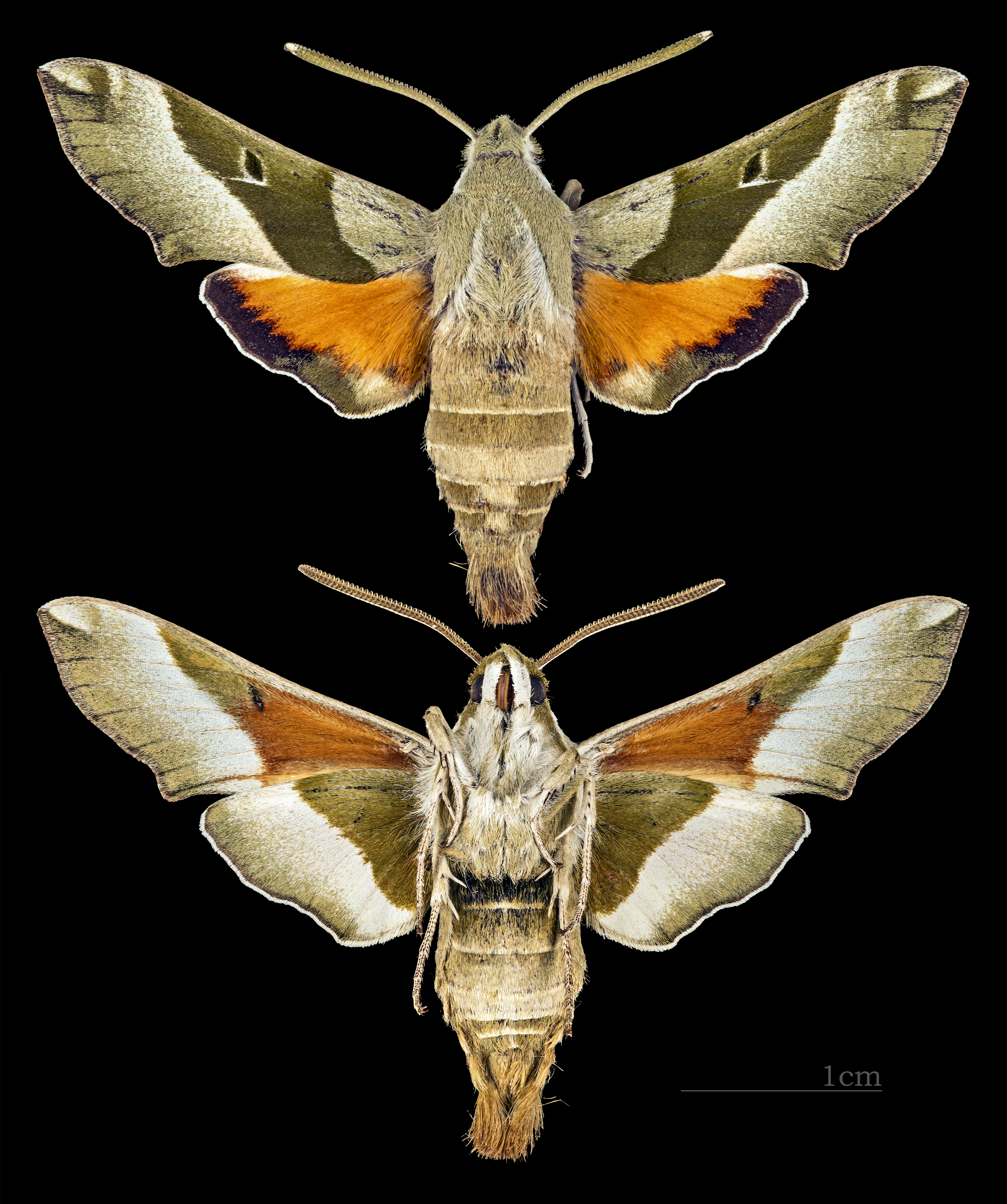
Proserpinus

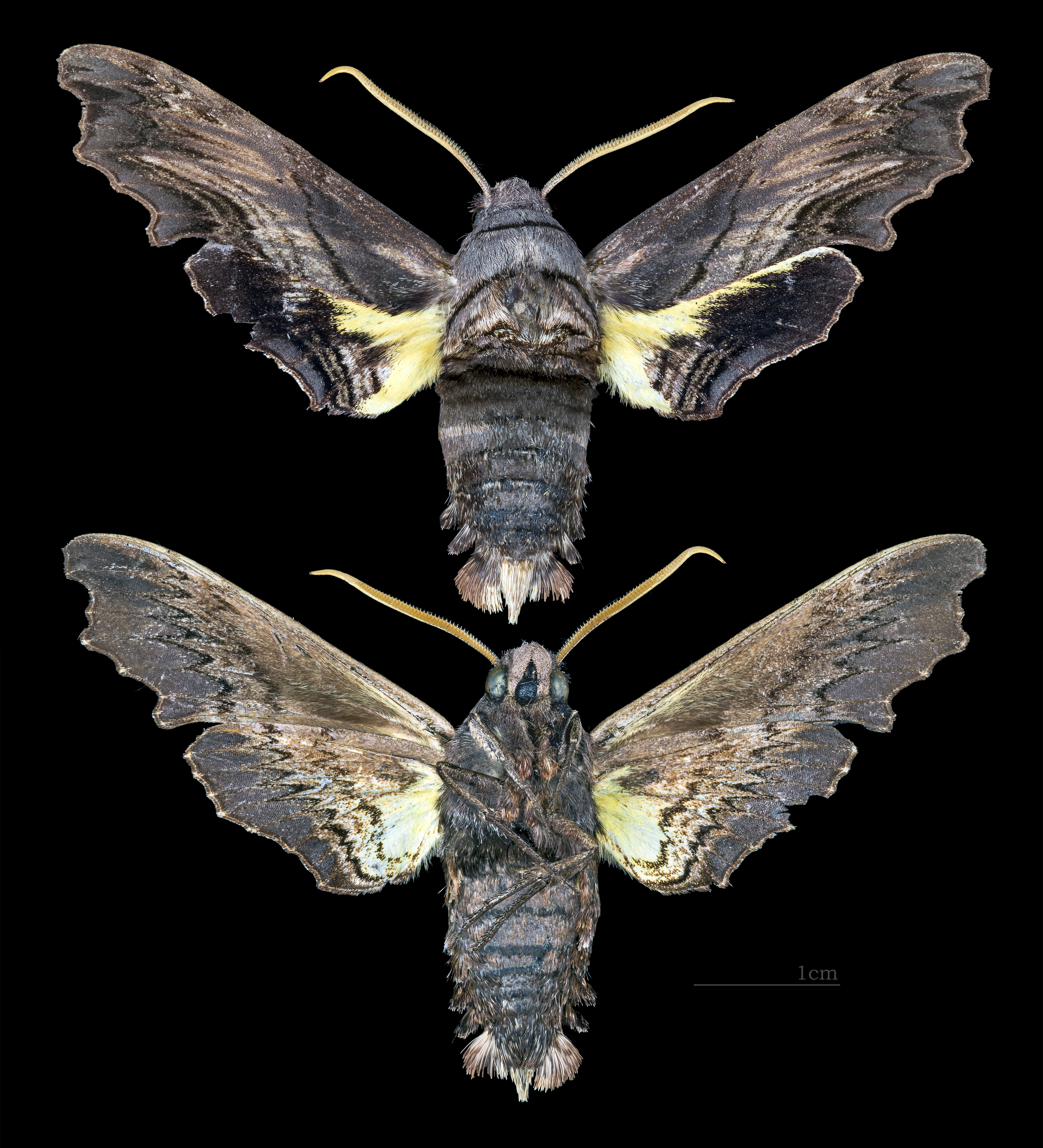
Sphecodina
