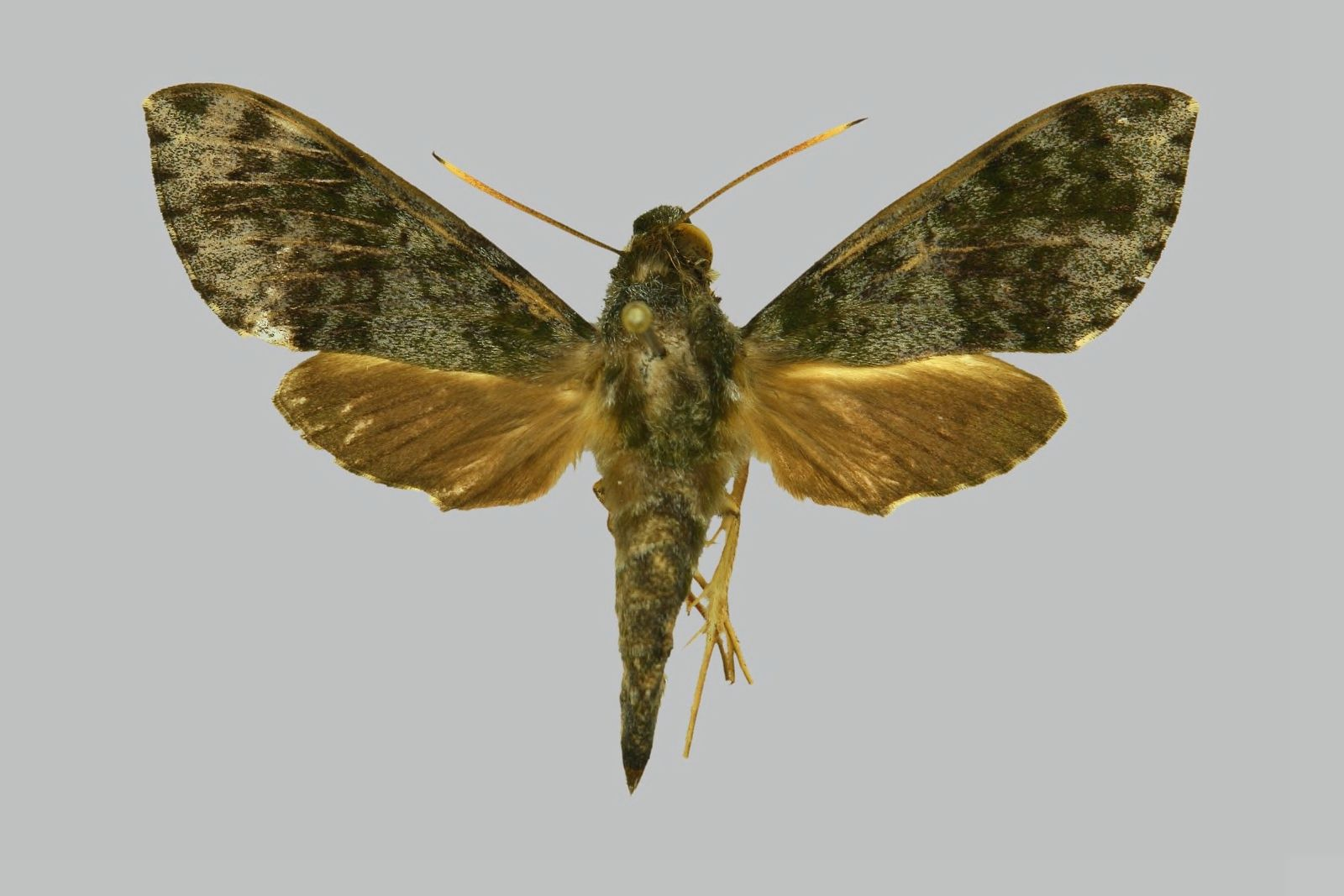

Scientific classification
- Kingdom: Animalia
- Phylum: Arthropoda
- Clade: Pancrustacea
- Class: Insecta
- Order: Lepidoptera
- Family: Sphingidae
- Genus: Griseosphinx
- Species: G. preechari

Binomial name
- Griseosphinx preechari Cadiou & Kitching 1990

= Griseosphinx preechari =

Species of moth

Griseosphinx preechari is a moth of the family Sphingidae. It is known from southern China to northern, western and central Thailand, and into Myanmar.

The length of the forewings is 24–30 mm for males and 25–20 mm for females.

Adults are on wing from April to October in Thailand.
