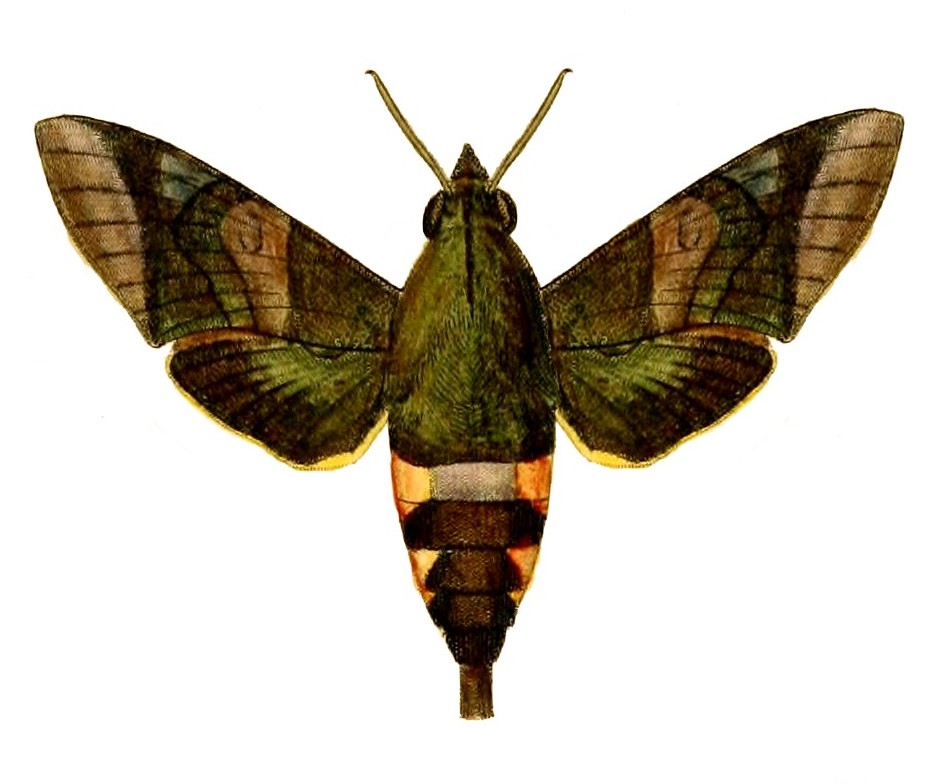

Scientific classification
- Kingdom: Animalia
- Phylum: Arthropoda
- Clade: Pancrustacea
- Class: Insecta
- Order: Lepidoptera
- Family: Sphingidae
- Subtribe: Macroglossina
- Genus: Atemnora; Rothschild & Jordan, 1903
- Species: A. westermannii

Binomial name
- Atemnora westermannii (Boisduval, 1875)

Synonyms
- Macroglossa westermannii Boisduval, 1875; Atemnora falkensteinii Dewitz

= Atemnora =

Genus of moths

Atemnora is a monotypic genus of moths in the family Sphingidae erected by Walter Rothschild and Karl Jordan in 1903. Its only species, Atemnora westermannii, described by Jean Baptiste Boisduval in 1875, is known from wooded habitats throughout the Ethiopian Region including Madagascar, but excluding the extreme south of Africa.

The length of the forewings is 23–31 mm.
