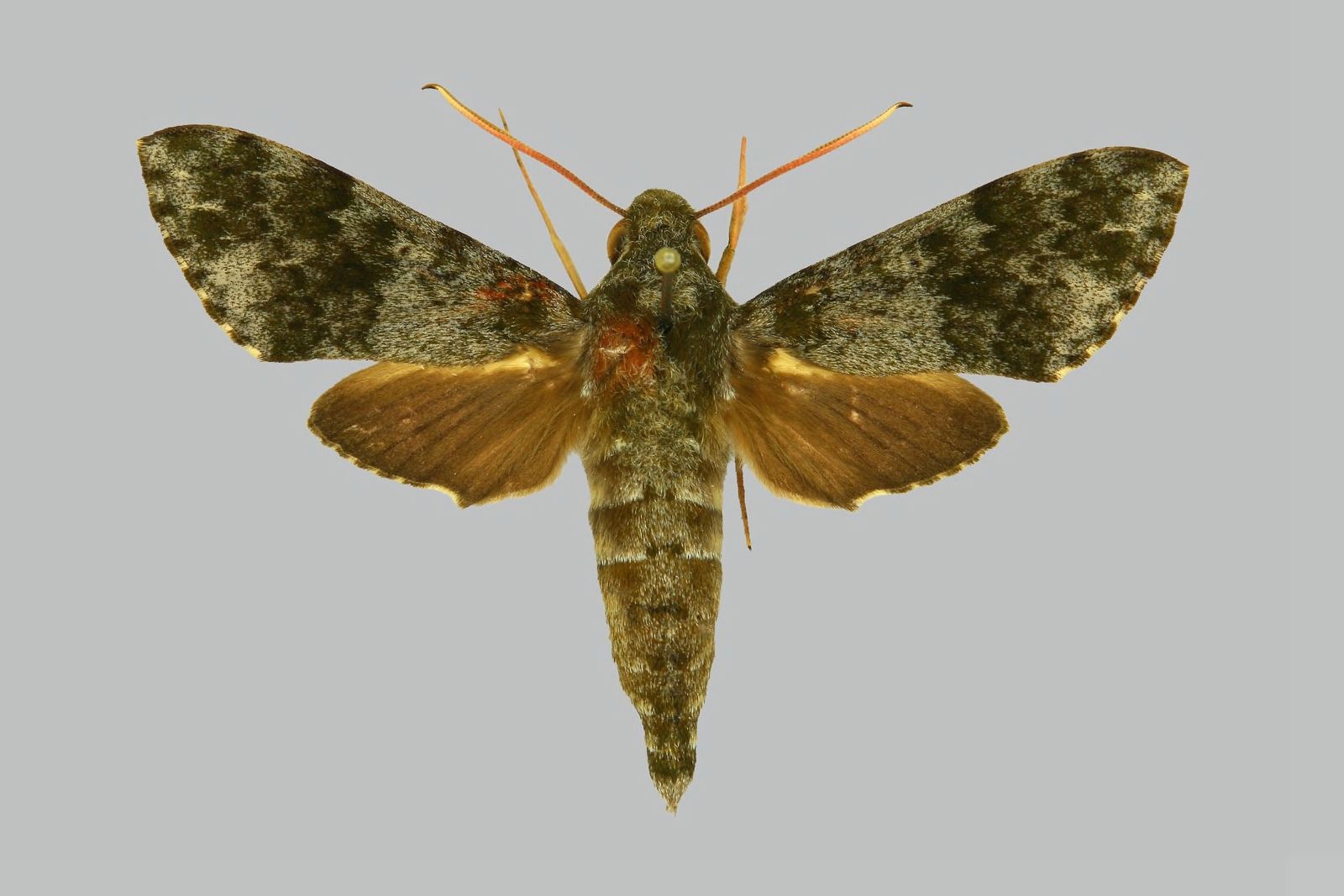
- Griseosphinx preechari

Scientific classification
- Kingdom: Animalia
- Phylum: Arthropoda
- Clade: Pancrustacea
- Class: Insecta
- Order: Lepidoptera
- Family: Sphingidae
- Subfamily: Macroglossinae
- Tribe: Macroglossini
- Genus: Griseosphinx; Cadiou & Kitching, 1990

= Griseosphinx =

Genus of moths

Griseosphinx is a genus of moths in the family Sphingidae. The genus was erected by Jean-Marie Cadiou and Ian Kitching in 1990.

== Species ==
- Griseosphinx marchandi Cadiou 1996
- Griseosphinx preechari Cadiou & Kitching 1990
