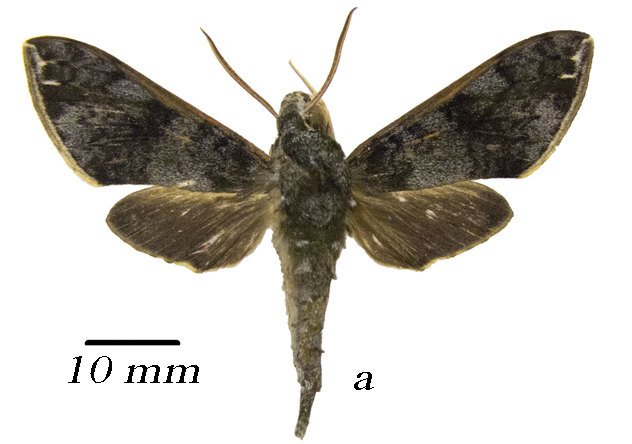

Scientific classification
- Kingdom: Animalia
- Phylum: Arthropoda
- Clade: Pancrustacea
- Class: Insecta
- Order: Lepidoptera
- Family: Sphingidae
- Genus: Griseosphinx
- Species: G. marchandi

Binomial name
- Griseosphinx marchandi Cadiou, 1996

= Griseosphinx marchandi =

Species of moth

Griseosphinx marchandi is a moth of the family Sphingidae. It is known from Vietnam.
