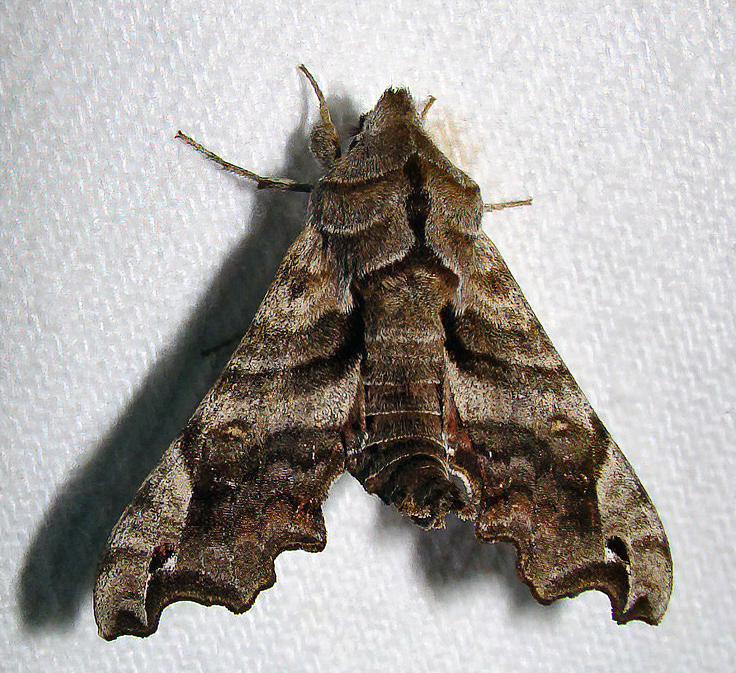

Scientific classification
- Kingdom: Animalia
- Phylum: Arthropoda
- Clade: Pancrustacea
- Class: Insecta
- Order: Lepidoptera
- Family: Sphingidae
- Subfamily: Macroglossinae
- Tribe: Macroglossini
- Subtribe: Macroglossina
- Genus: Deidamia; Clemens, 1859
- Species: D. inscriptum

Binomial name
- Deidamia inscriptum (Harris, 1839)

Synonyms
- Deidamia inscripta; Pterogon inscriptum Harris, 1839

= Deidamia inscriptum =

Species of moth

Deidamia inscriptum, the lettered sphinx, is a species of moth of the family Sphingidae. It is the only member of the genus Deidamia. The species was first described by Thaddeus William Harris in 1839 and the genus was erected by James Brackenridge Clemens in 1859.

== Distribution ==
It is found in North America from Florida to Mississippi, and in Michigan, Wisconsin, Ontario, Quebec and South Carolina.

== Description ==
The wingspan is 45–70 mm.

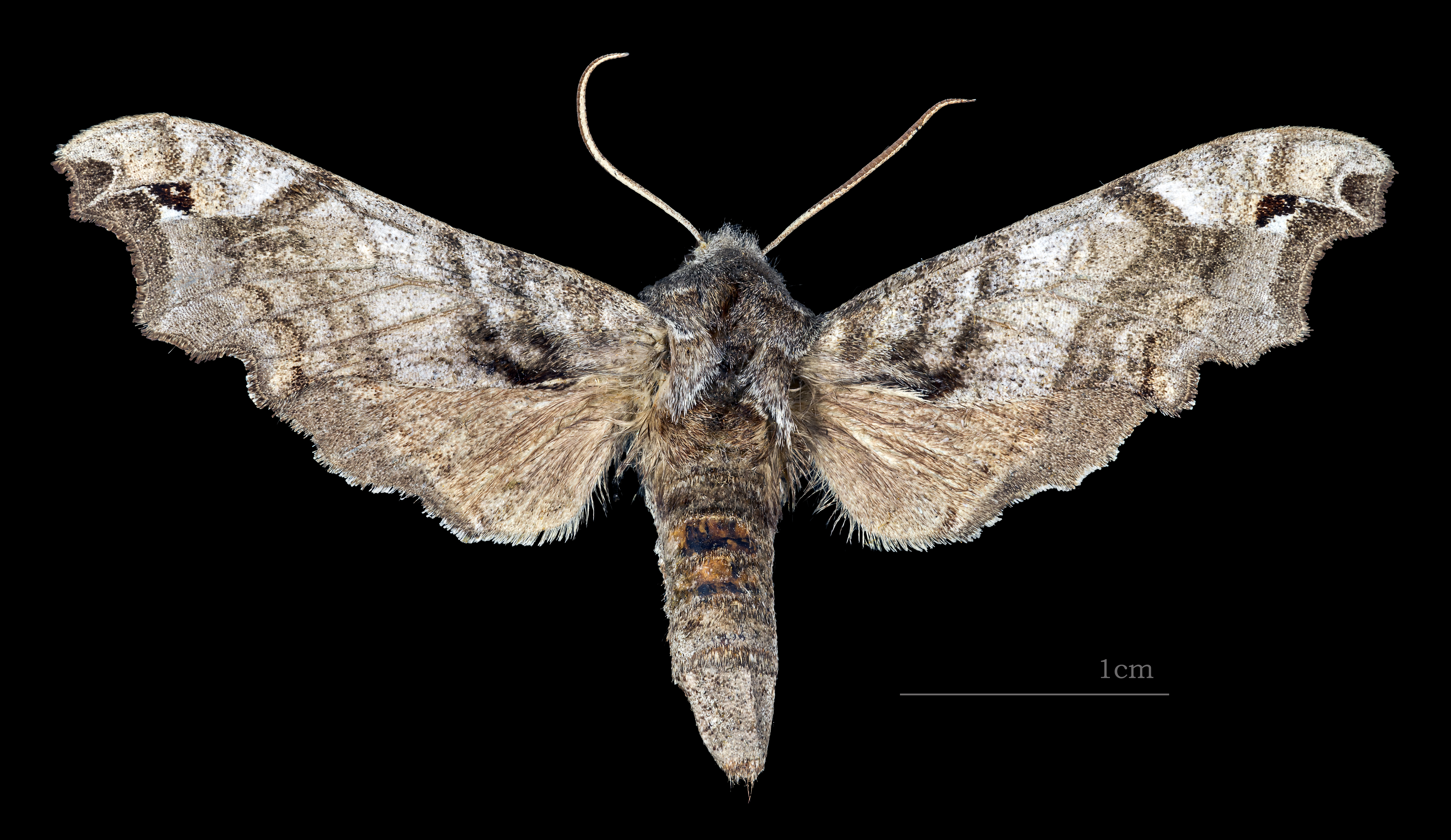
Female dorsal view

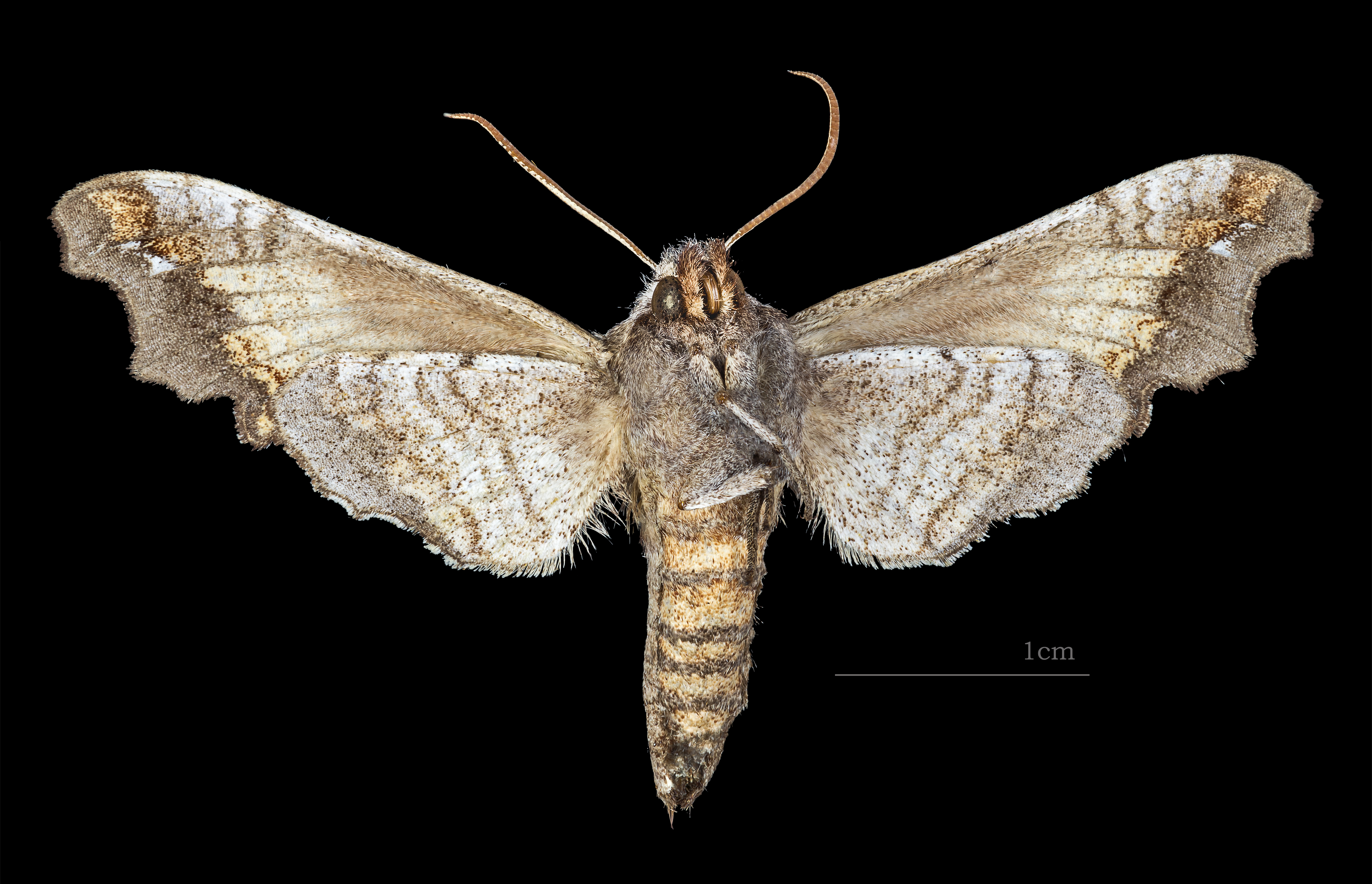
Female ventral view

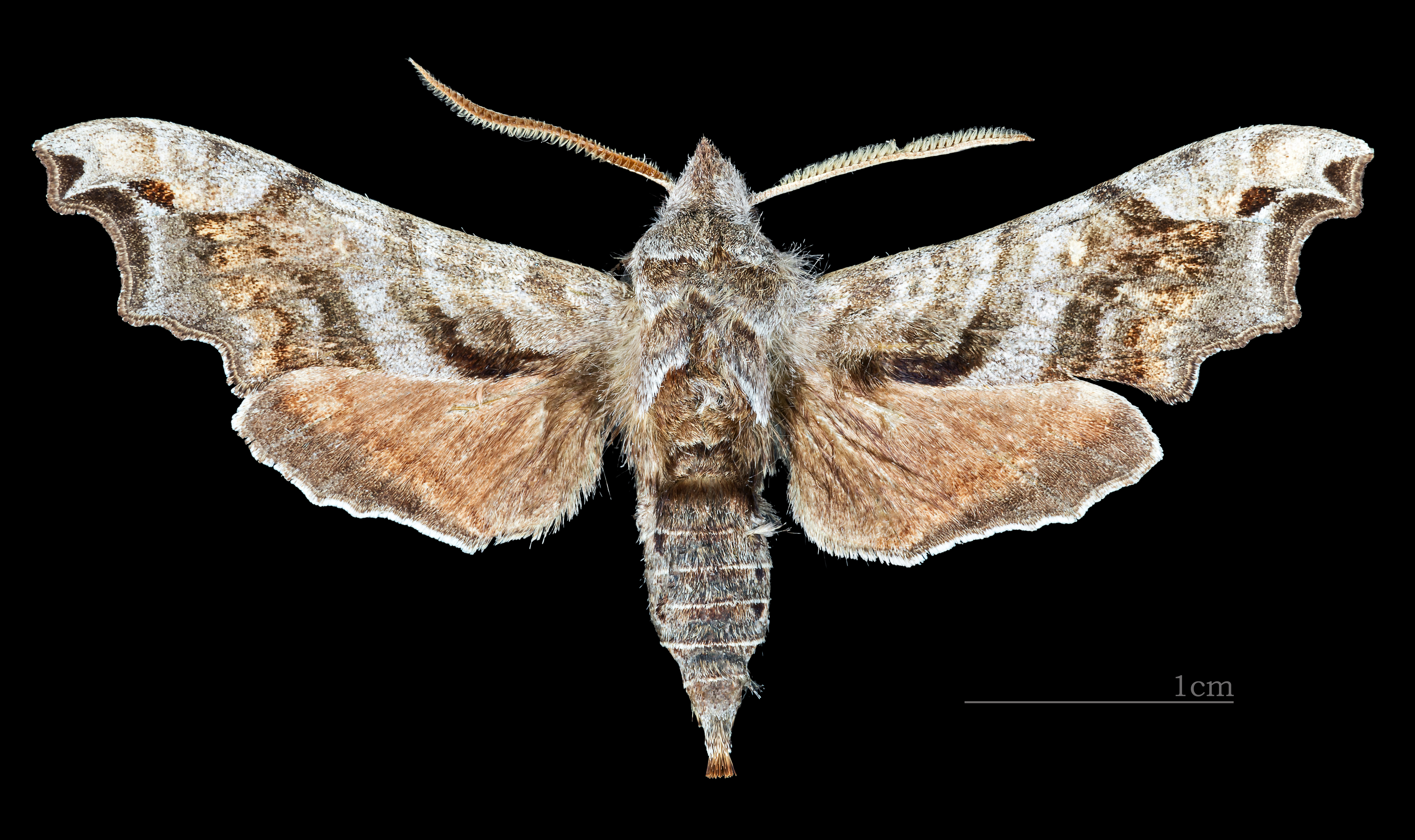
Male dorsal view

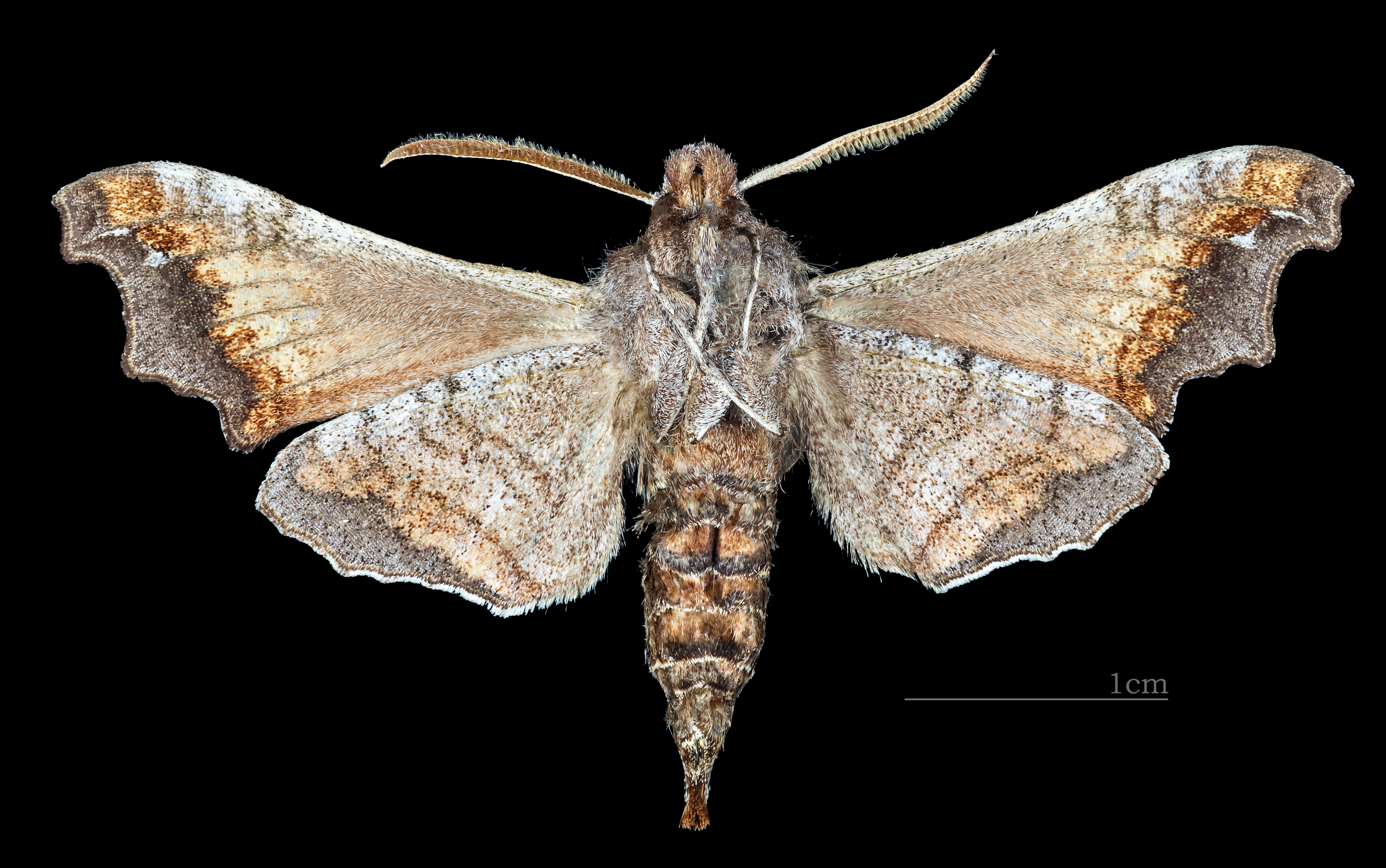
Male ventral view

== Biology ==
The larvae feed on Vitis, Ampelopsis and Parthenocissus species.
