= Phanoxyla =

Scientific classification
- Kingdom: Animalia
- Phylum: Arthropoda
- Class: Insecta
- Order: Lepidoptera
- Family: Sphingidae
- Subtribe: Choerocampina
- Genus: Phanoxyla; Rothschild & Jordan, 1903
- Species: P. hystrix

Binomial name
- Phanoxyla hystrix (R. Felder, 1874)

Synonyms
- Chaerocampa hystrix R. Felder, 1874

Genus of moths

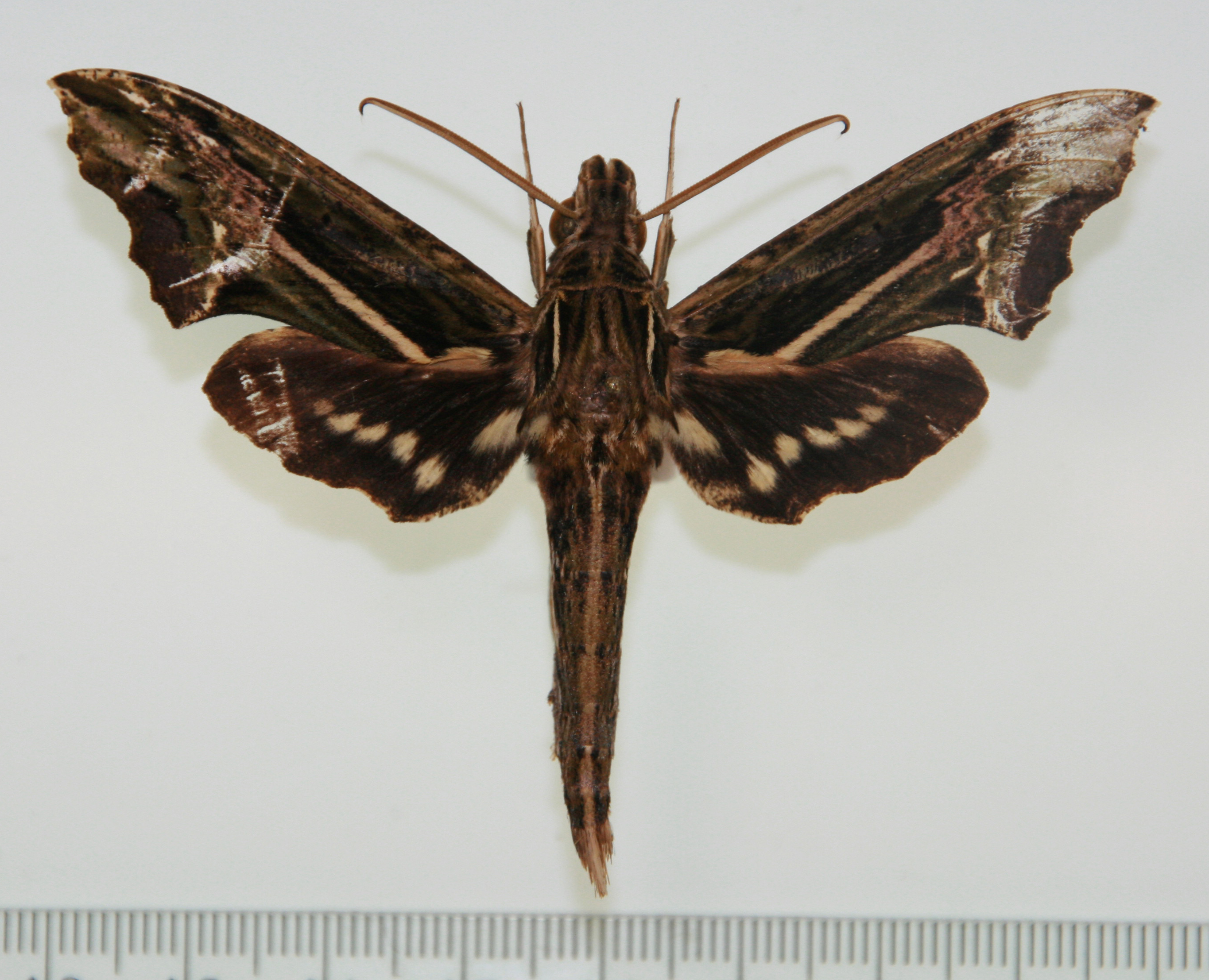
Phanoxyla kitchingi holotype (Colombia, Antioquia, Vereda Caño Seco, Rio Nare) male upperside

Phanoxyla is a monotypic moth genus in the family Sphingidae first described by Walter Rothschild and Karl Jordan in 1903. Its only species, Phanoxyla hystrix, described by Rudolf Felder in 1874, is known from northern South America, including Brazil and Ecuador.

Adults are probably on wing year round.
