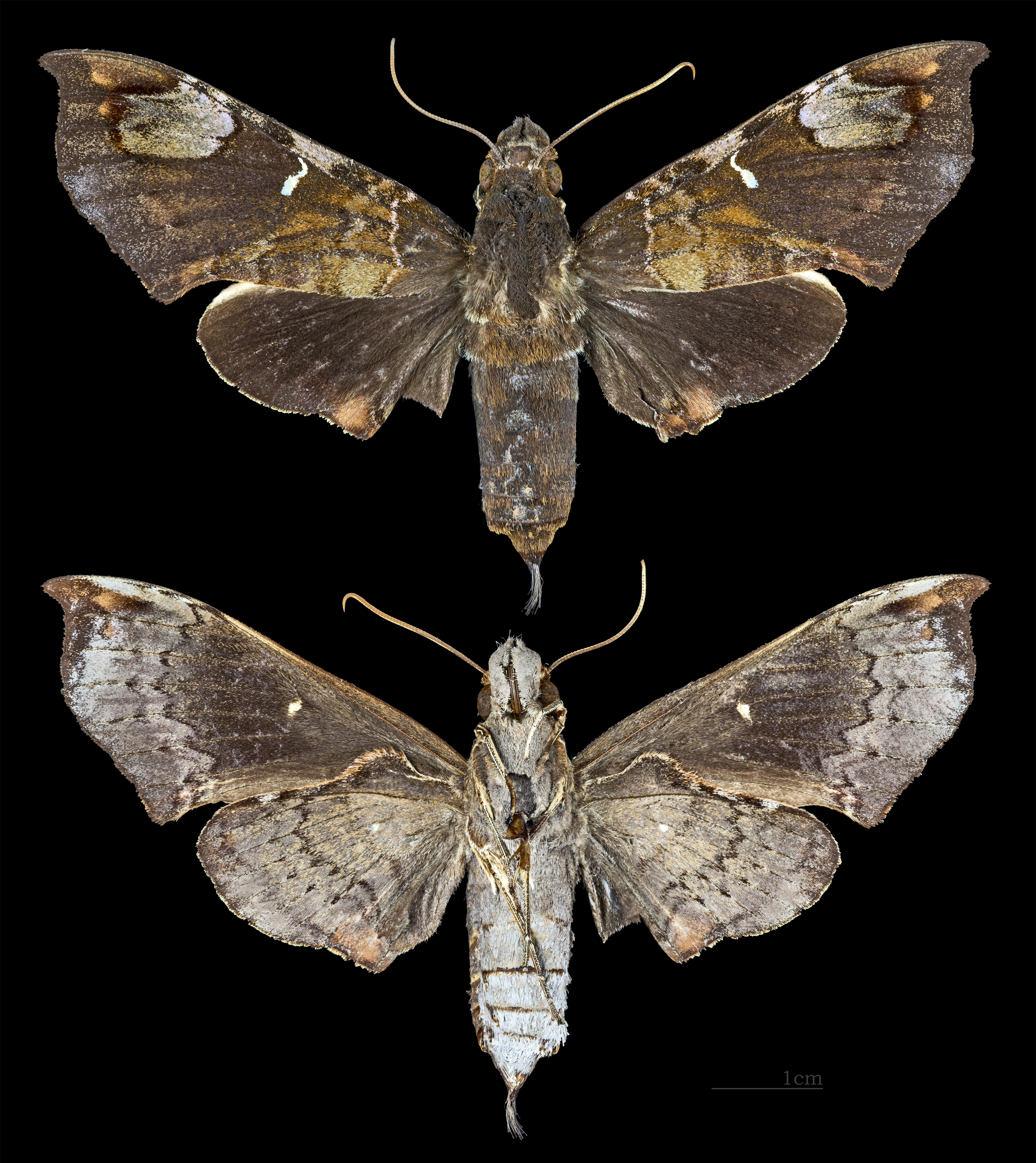
- Giganteopalpus mirabilis

Scientific classification
- Kingdom: Animalia
- Phylum: Arthropoda
- Class: Insecta
- Order: Lepidoptera
- Family: Sphingidae
- Tribe: Macroglossini
- Genus: Giganteopalpus; Huwe, 1895
- Species: G. mirabilis

Binomial name
- Giganteopalpus mirabilis (Rothschild, 1895)

Synonyms
- Eurypteryx mirabilis Rothschild, 1895; Giganteopalpus capito Huwe, 1895

= Giganteopalpus =

Genus of moths

Giganteopalpus is a monotypic moth genus in the family Sphingidae first described by Adolph Huwe in 1895. Its only species, Giganteopalpus mirabilis, described by Walter Rothschild in 1895, is known from Sundaland.

It is very similar to Eurypteryx species but can be distinguished by its enlarged labial palps, with the second segment being broader than it is long, and the costal margin of the hindwing having a prominent antemedian lobe.

The larvae possibly feed on Araceae species.
