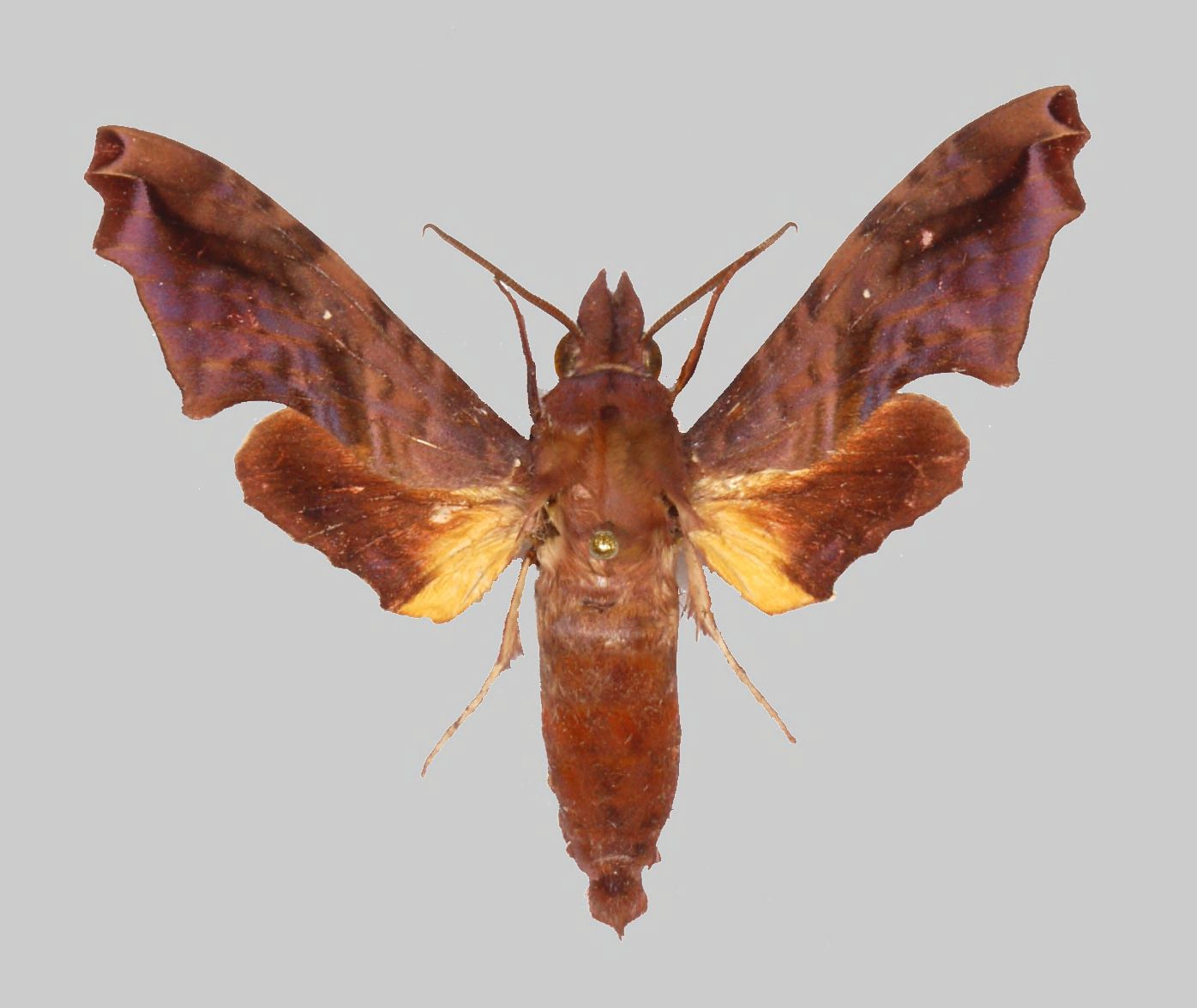

Scientific classification
- Kingdom: Animalia
- Phylum: Arthropoda
- Class: Insecta
- Order: Lepidoptera
- Family: Sphingidae
- Subtribe: Macroglossina
- Genus: Pseudenyo; Holland, 1889
- Species: P. benitensis

Binomial name
- Pseudenyo benitensis Holland, 1889

= Pseudenyo =

Genus of moths

Pseudenyo is a genus of moths in the family Sphingidae, consisting of one species, Pseudenyo benitensis, which is found from Nigeria to Gabon.

Both the genus and the species were described by William Jacob Holland in 1889.
