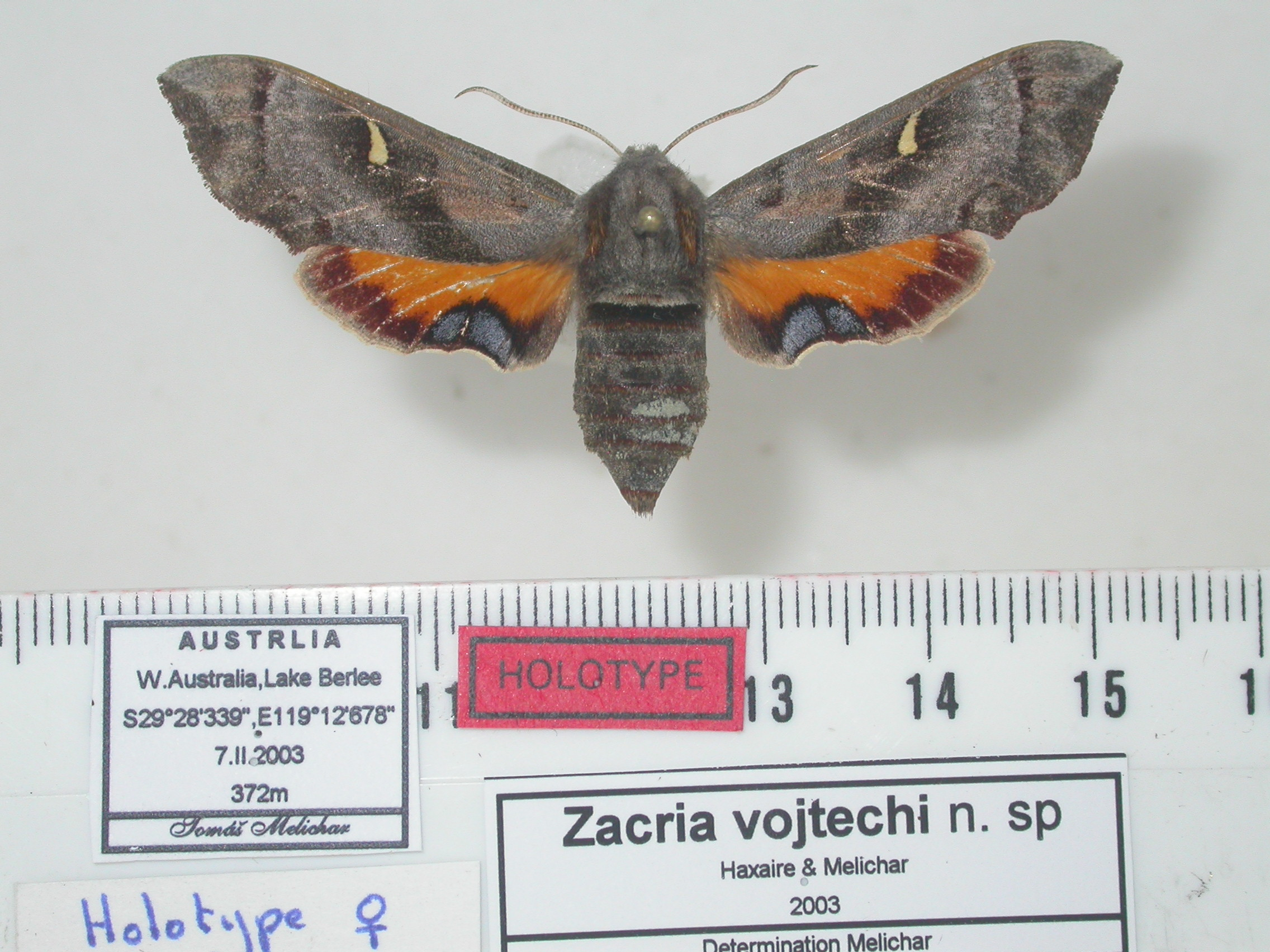
- Zacria vojtechi Holotype female upperside (Australia, Lake Berlee) (ANIC)

Scientific classification
- Domain: Eukaryota
- Kingdom: Animalia
- Phylum: Arthropoda
- Class: Insecta
- Order: Lepidoptera
- Family: Sphingidae
- Subtribe: Macroglossina
- Genus: Zacria; Haxaire & Melichar, 2003
- Species: Z. vojtechi

Binomial name
- Zacria vojtechi Haxaire & Melichar, 2003

= Zacria =

Genus of moths

Zacria is a genus of moths in the family Sphingidae, containing only one species Zacria vojtechi, which is known from Western Australia.
