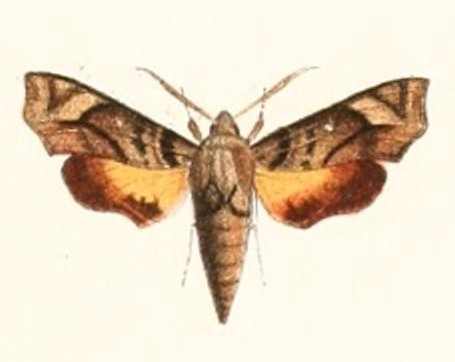

Scientific classification
- Domain: Eukaryota
- Kingdom: Animalia
- Phylum: Arthropoda
- Class: Insecta
- Order: Lepidoptera
- Family: Sphingidae
- Subtribe: Macroglossina
- Genus: Temnoripais; Rothschild & Jordan, 1903
- Species: T. lasti

Binomial name
- Temnoripais lasti (Rothschild, 1894)

Synonyms
- Pterogon lasti Rothschild, 1894

= Temnoripais =

Genus of moths

Temnoripais is a genus of moths in the family Sphingidae, consisting of one species, Temnoripais lasti, which is known from Madagascar.

The forewing upperside has a rather broad and brown basal band. Thepostmedian line is angled. The discal spot is minute and white. The hindwing upperside is basally yellow, the median band is orange, diffuse and merges distally into the wide blackish marginal band.
