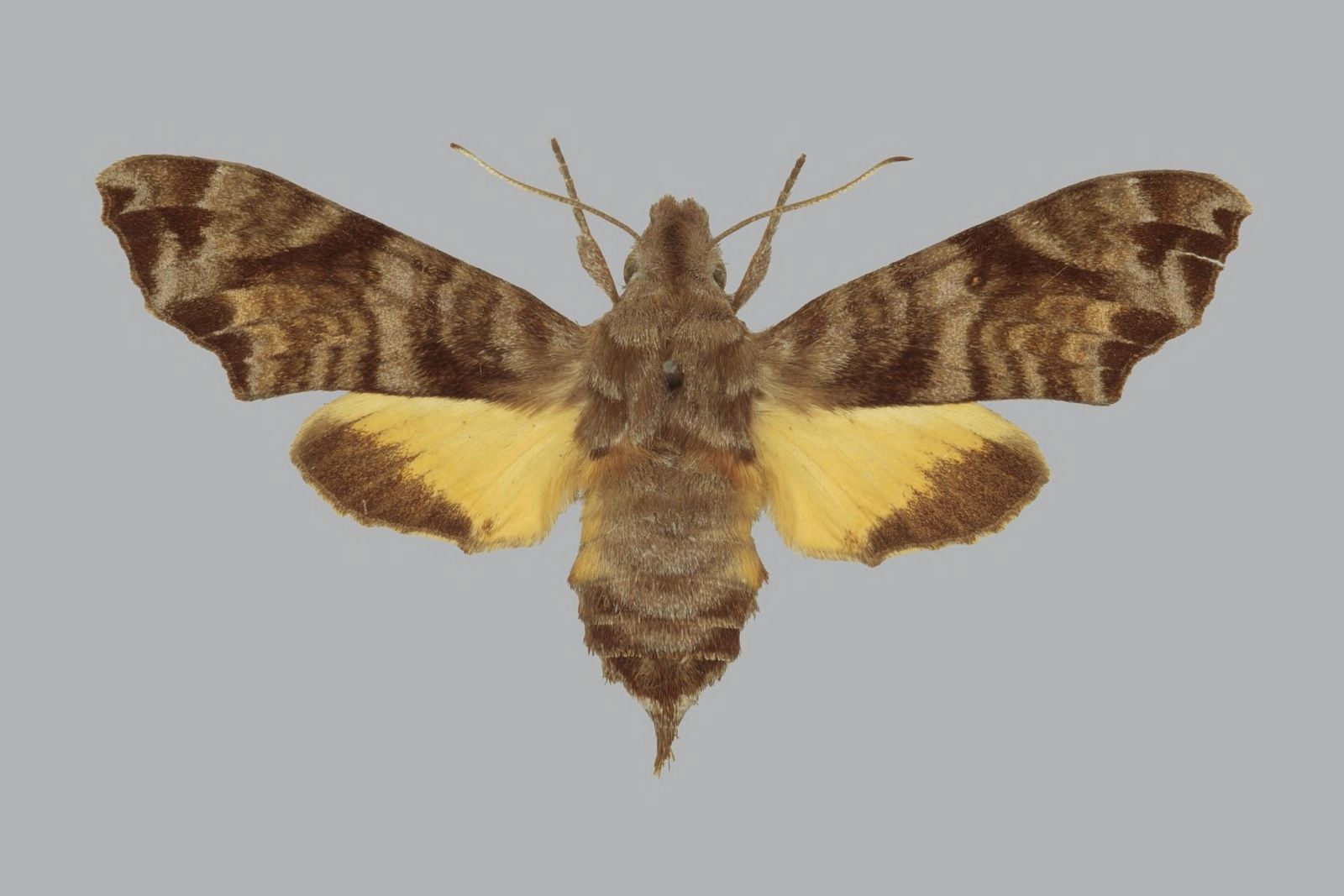

Scientific classification
- Kingdom: Animalia
- Phylum: Arthropoda
- Class: Insecta
- Order: Lepidoptera
- Family: Sphingidae
- Subtribe: Macroglossina
- Genus: Micracosmeryx; Mell, 1922
- Species: M. chaochauensis

Binomial name
- Micracosmeryx chaochauensis (Clark, 1922)

Synonyms
- Gurelca chaochauensis Clark, 1922; Micracosmeryx macroglossoides Mell, 1922

= Micracosmeryx =

Genus of moths

Micracosmeryx is a monotypic moth genus in the family Sphingidae first described by Rudolf Mell in 1922. Its only species, Micracosmeryx chaochauensis, described by Benjamin Preston Clark in 1922, is known from southern China and northern Vietnam.
