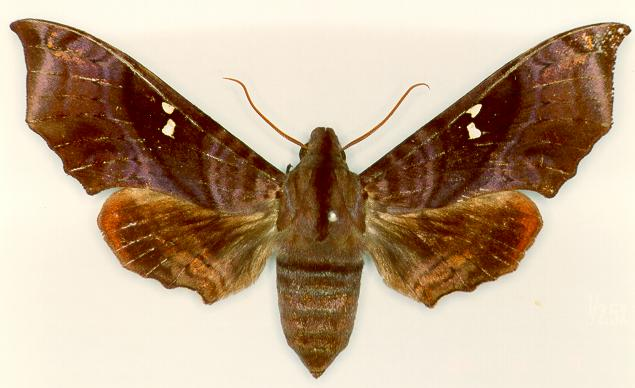

Scientific classification
- Domain: Eukaryota
- Kingdom: Animalia
- Phylum: Arthropoda
- Class: Insecta
- Order: Lepidoptera
- Family: Sphingidae
- Genus: Altijuba; Lachlan, 1999
- Species: A. oktediensis

Binomial name
- Altijuba oktediensis Lachlan, 1999

= Altijuba =

Genus of moths

Altijuba is a monotypic moth genus in the family Sphingidae. Its only species, Altijuba oktediensis, is known from Papua New Guinea. Both the genus and species were first described by Robert B. Lachlan in 1999.
