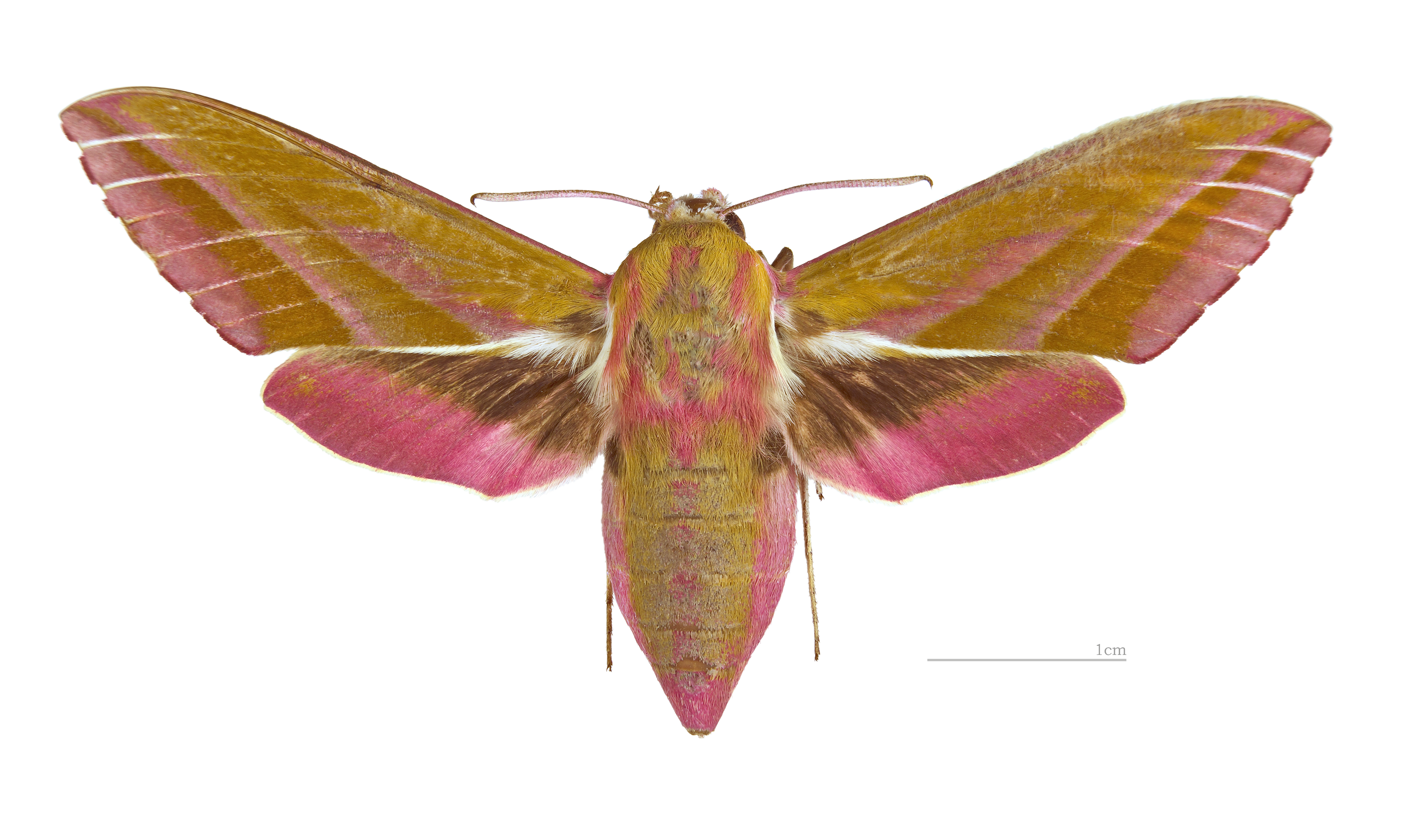
- Elephant hawk moth

Scientific classification
- Kingdom: Animalia
- Phylum: Arthropoda
- Clade: Pancrustacea
- Class: Insecta
- Order: Lepidoptera
- Family: Sphingidae
- Subtribe: Choerocampina
- Genus: Deilephila; Laspeyres, 1809

Species
- Deilephila askoldensis; Deilephila elpenor; Deilephila nerii; Deilephila porcellus; Deilephila rivularis

Synonyms
- Choerocampa Duponchel, 1835; Cinogon Butler, 1881; Dilephila Hampson, 1893; Dilephila Kuznetsova, 1906; Dilophila Agassiz, 1846; Elpenor Agassiz, 1846; Elpenor Oken, 1815; Eumorpha Hübner, 1806; Metopsilus Duncan, 1836

= Deilephila =

Genus of moths

The genus Deilephila is part of the family Sphingidae, the hawk-moths or sphinxes. The genus was erected by Jakob Heinrich Laspeyres in 1809. It consists of a small number of Palearctic species most of which have common names involving the phrase "elephant hawk moth". They include the elephant hawk moth, Deilephila elpenor; the small elephant hawk moth (D. porcellus) and the Chitral elephant hawk moth (D. rivularis). The oleander hawk moth is sometimes classified in this genus as D. nerii, but sometimes treated in genus Daphnis.

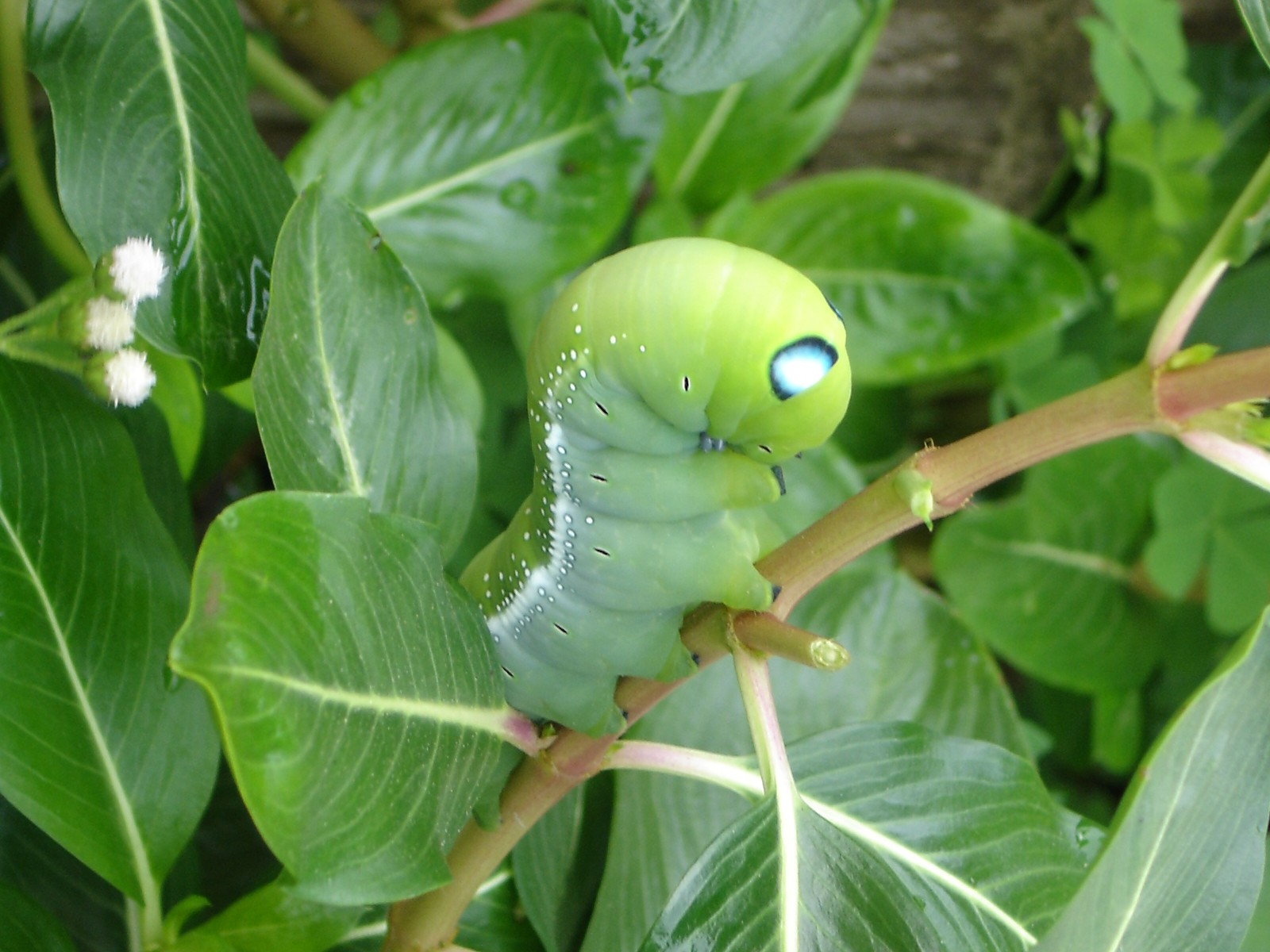
Oleander hawk moth caterpillar

The adults are quite similar to those of the related and larger genus Hyles. However their eyelashes are much more distinct, and the numerous spines on their abdomens are less strongly chitinized. They lay pale glossy green eggs. The larvae are not typical of hawk moth caterpillars, with the horn on the terminal segment being less pronounced than usual, and absent in some species. The head and thorax segments can be retracted into the first and second segments of the abdomen, which then appear enlarged and display eyespots.

The caterpillars feed mainly on plants of the Onagraceae and Rubiaceae families.

- Deilephila askoldensis (Oberthür, 1879)
- Deilephila elpenor (Linnaeus, 1758)
- Deilephila porcellus (Linnaeus, 1758)
- Deilephila rivularis (Boisduval, 1875)
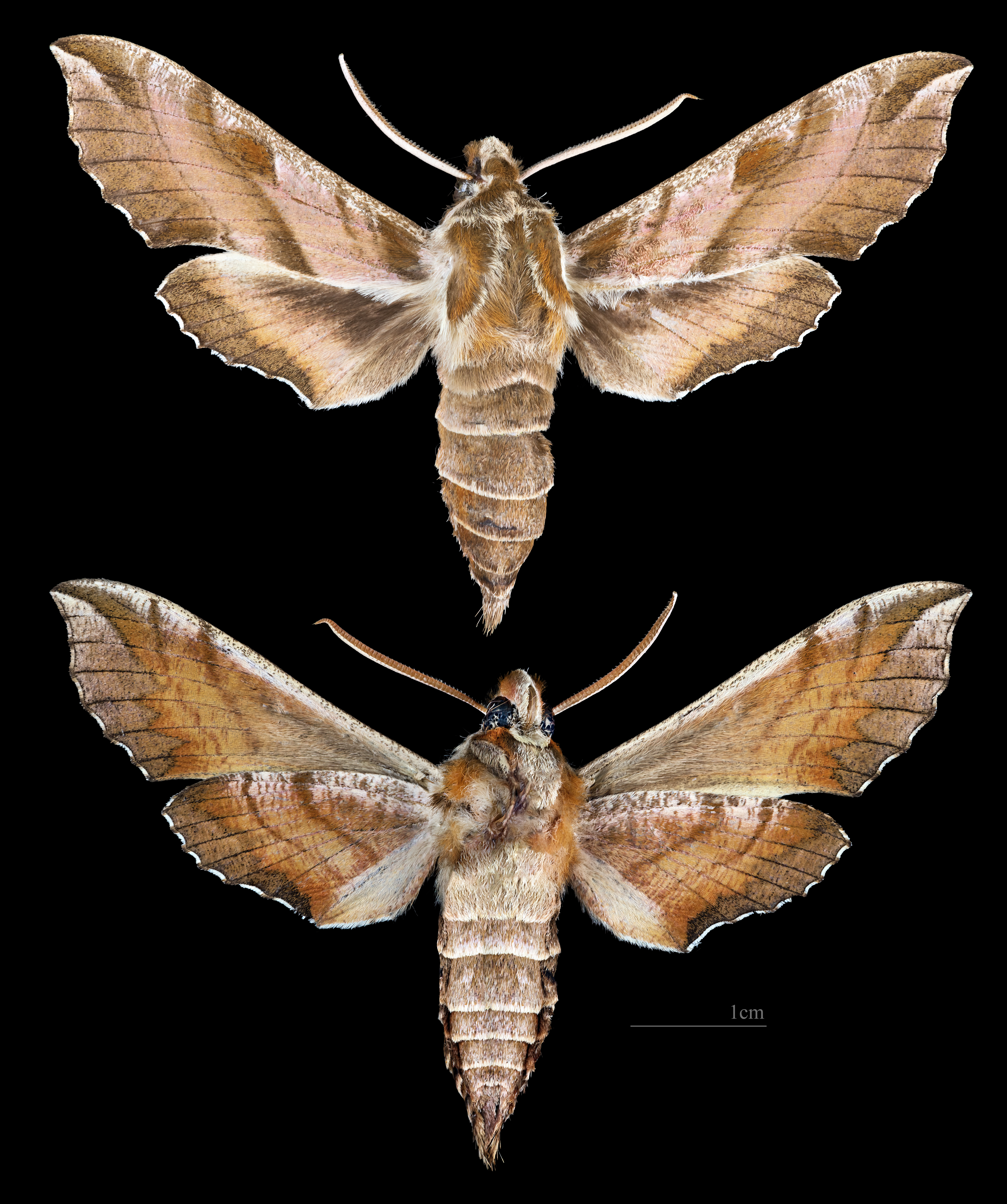
Deilephila askoldensis

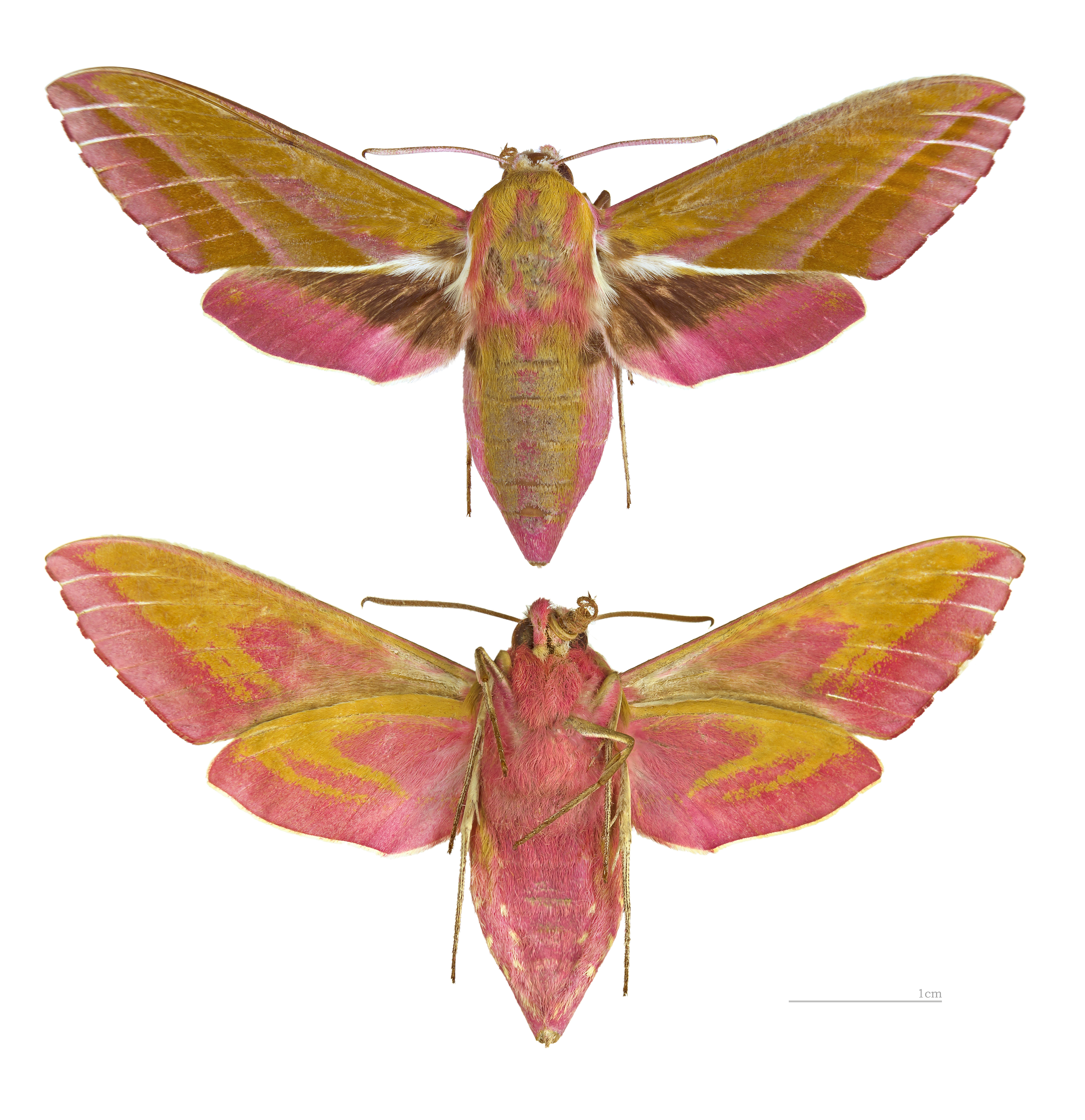
Deilephila elpenor

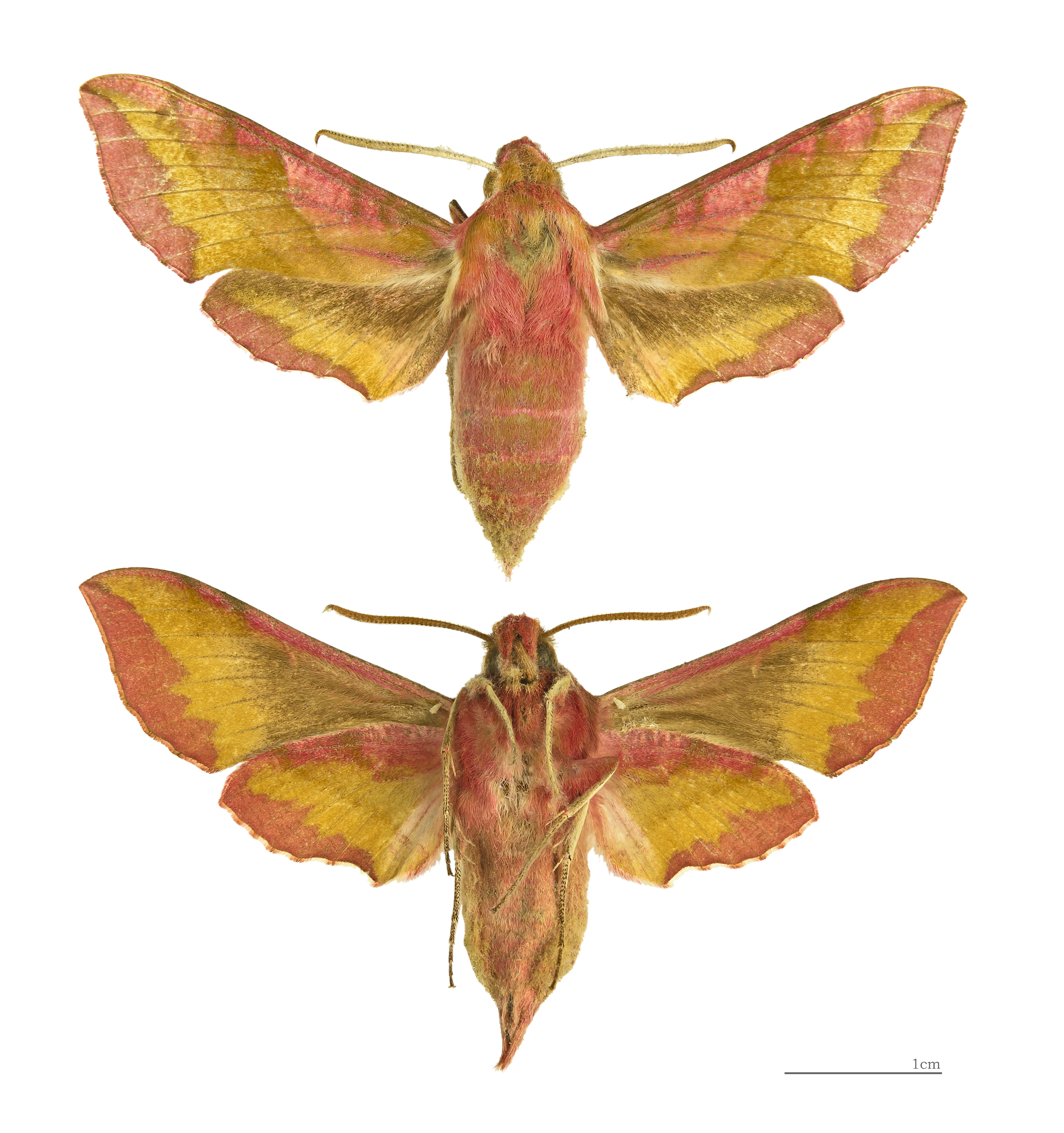
Deilephila porcellus
