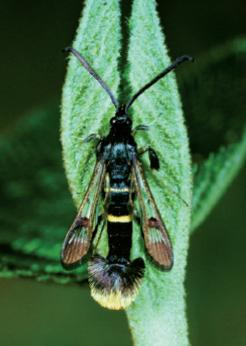

Scientific classification
- Kingdom: Animalia
- Phylum: Arthropoda
- Clade: Pancrustacea
- Class: Insecta
- Order: Lepidoptera
- Family: Sesiidae
- Genus: Synanthedon
- Species: S. andrenaeformis

Binomial name
- Synanthedon andrenaeformis (Laspeyres, 1801)

Synonyms
- List: Sesia andrenaeformis Laspeyres, 1801; Trochilium andraeniformis (Westwood, 1841); Sesia andreniformis (Staudinger, 1861); Sphinx anthraciniformis (Esper, 1800); Trochilium allantiformis (Newman, 1832); Synanthedon monedulaeformis Vorbrodt, 1914; Synanthedon perigordensis Garrevoet & Vanholder, 1996; Sphinx anthraciformis (Esper, 1800); Sesia oxibeliformis (Boisduval, 1840) (nomen nudum); Sesia andrenaeformis v. monedulaeformis (Boisduval, 1840) (nomen nudum)

= Synanthedon andrenaeformis =

Species of moth

Synanthedon andrenaeformis, the orange-tailed clearwing, is a moth of the family Sesiidae. It is known from most of Europe. It is also present in the Near East. The wingspan is 18–22 mm. Adults are on wing between May and June in western Europe.

The larvae feed on wayfaring tree (Viburnum lantana) and guelder tree (Viburnum opulus), boring into the stem. The larvae live for two years or more.

== Subspecies ==
- Synanthedon andrenaeformis andrenaeformis (Laspeyres, 1801)
- Synanthedon andrenaeformis tenuicingulata Špatenka, 1997 (Turkey, Armenia)
