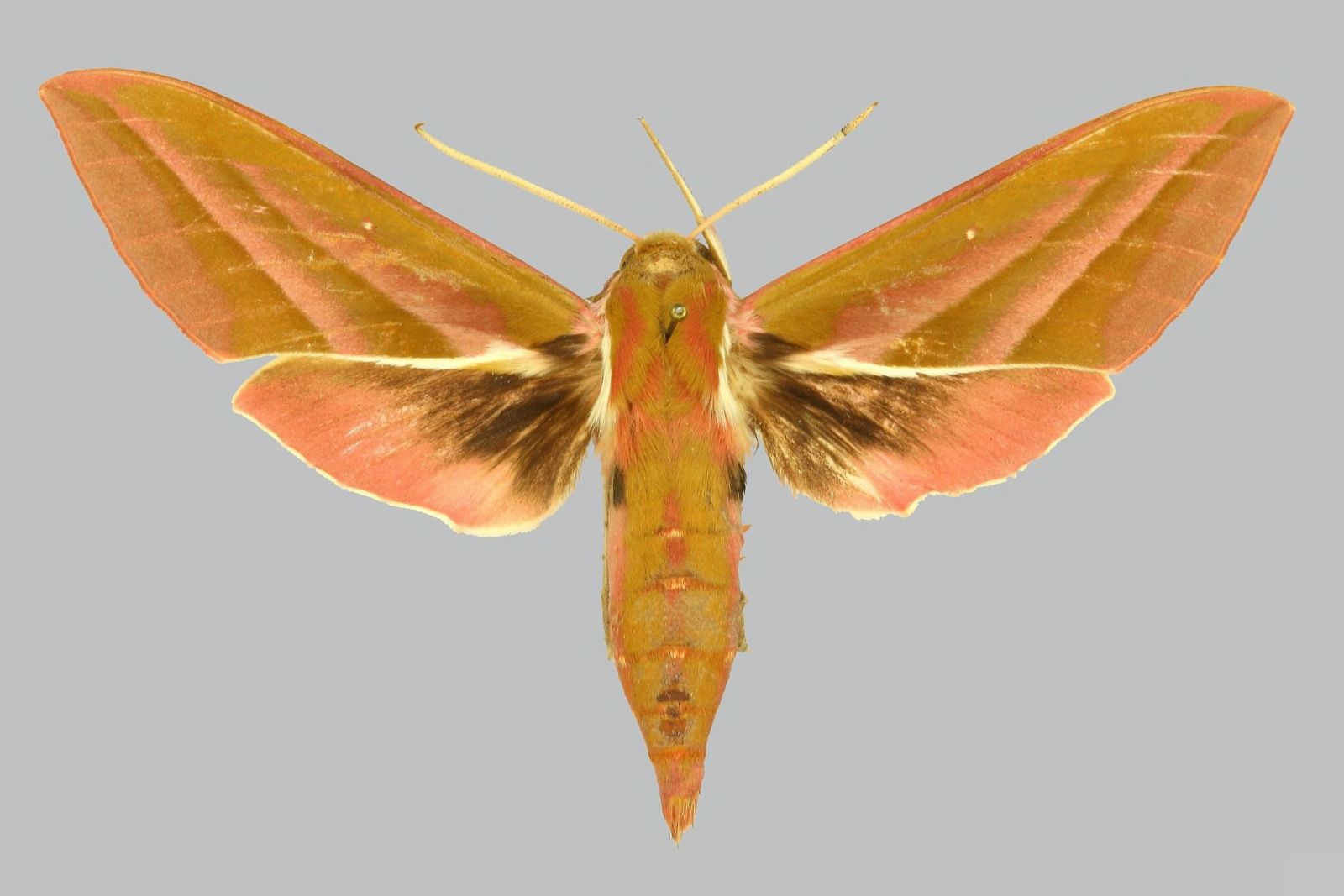
- Male

Scientific classification
- Domain: Eukaryota
- Kingdom: Animalia
- Phylum: Arthropoda
- Class: Insecta
- Order: Lepidoptera
- Family: Sphingidae
- Genus: Deilephila
- Species: D. rivularis

Binomial name
- Deilephila rivularis (Boisduval, 1875)

Synonyms
- Choerocampa rivularis Boisduval, 1875; Chaerocampa fraterna Butler, 1875

= Deilephila rivularis =

Chitral elephant hawk moth

Species of moth

Deilephila rivularis, the Chitral elephant hawk moth, is a moth of the family Sphingidae. The species was first described by Jean Baptiste Boisduval in 1875. It is found in east and central Afghanistan, Pakistan (north of Karachi) and in northern India (east to Dehradun, Uttar Pradesh).

The wingspan is 64–82 mm.

The larvae feed on Arisaema and Impatiens species in India.
