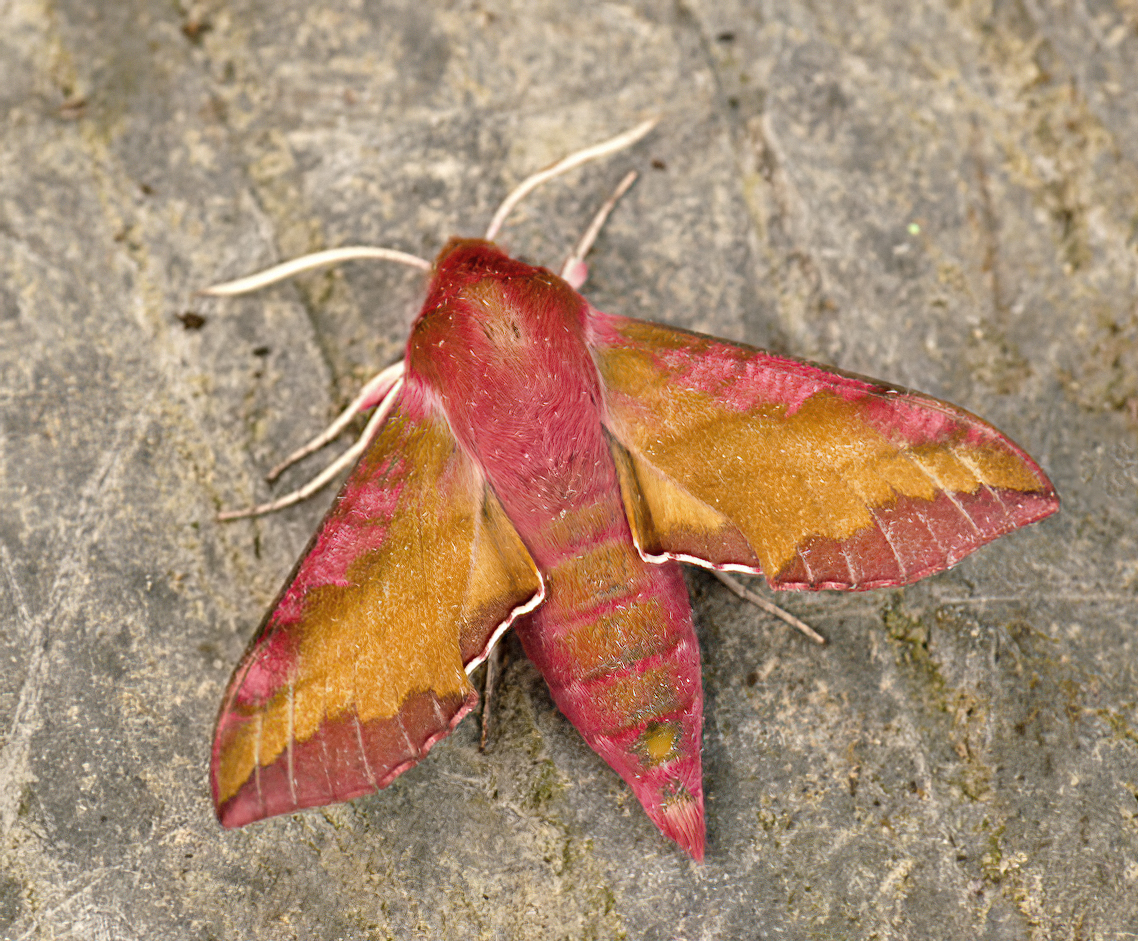

Scientific classification
- Kingdom: Animalia
- Phylum: Arthropoda
- Class: Insecta
- Order: Lepidoptera
- Family: Sphingidae
- Genus: Deilephila
- Species: D. porcellus

Binomial name
- Deilephila porcellus (Linnaeus, 1758)

Synonyms
- Sphinx porcellus Linnaeus, 1758; Theretra porcellus clara Tutt, 1904; Pergesa porcellus wesloeensis Knoch, 1929; Pergesa porcellus sus O. Bang-Haas, 1927; Pergesa porcellus sinkiangensis Chu & Wang, 1980; Pergesa porcellus rosea Zerny, 1933; Pergesa porcellus porca O. Bang-Haas, 1927; Pergesa porcellus kuruschi O. Bang-Haas, 1938; Pergesa porcellus flavocincta Wize, 1917; Pergesa porcellus cingulata O. Bang-Haas, 1934; Metopsilus porcellus galbana Gillmer, 1910; Metopsilus porcellus colossus A. Bang-Haas, 1906; Eumorpha porcellus gissarodarvasica Shchetkin, 1981; Deilephila porcellus warneckei Capuse, 1963; Deilephila porcellus suellus Staudinger, 1878; Deilephila porcellus songoricus Eitschberger & Lukhtanov, 1996; Deilephila porcellus sibirica Eitschberger & Zolotuhin, 1997; Deilephila porcellus kashgoulii Ebert, 1976; Deilephila porcellus decolor Cockayne, 1953; Choerocampa porcellus lutescens Cockerell, 1887

= Deilephila porcellus =

Small elephant hawk-moth

Species of moth

Deilephila porcellus, the small elephant hawk-moth, is a moth of the family Sphingidae. The species was first described by Carl Linnaeus in his 1758 10th edition of Systema Naturae.

== Distribution ==
It is found in Europe, North Africa and West Asia.

== Description ==
The wingspan is 45–51 millimeters (1.8–2.0 in). The moth flies from May to July depending on the location. The forewings are ochreous with a faint olive tinge; the front margin is edged and blotched with pinkish, and there is a broad but irregular band of the same colour on the outer margin. The hindwings are blackish on their upper margin, pinkish on their outer margin, and ochreous tinged with olive between. The fringes are chequered whitish, sometimes tinged with pink. The head, thorax, and body are pinkish, more or less variegated with olive; the thorax has a patch of white hairs above the base of the wings. It is highly variable in colouration. In drier and warmer and arid areas of Asia Minor and Central Asia the pink colouration is absent. Form rosea Zerny is intermediate; f. indistincta Tutt is pinkish grey; f. suellus is yellowish sandy buff.

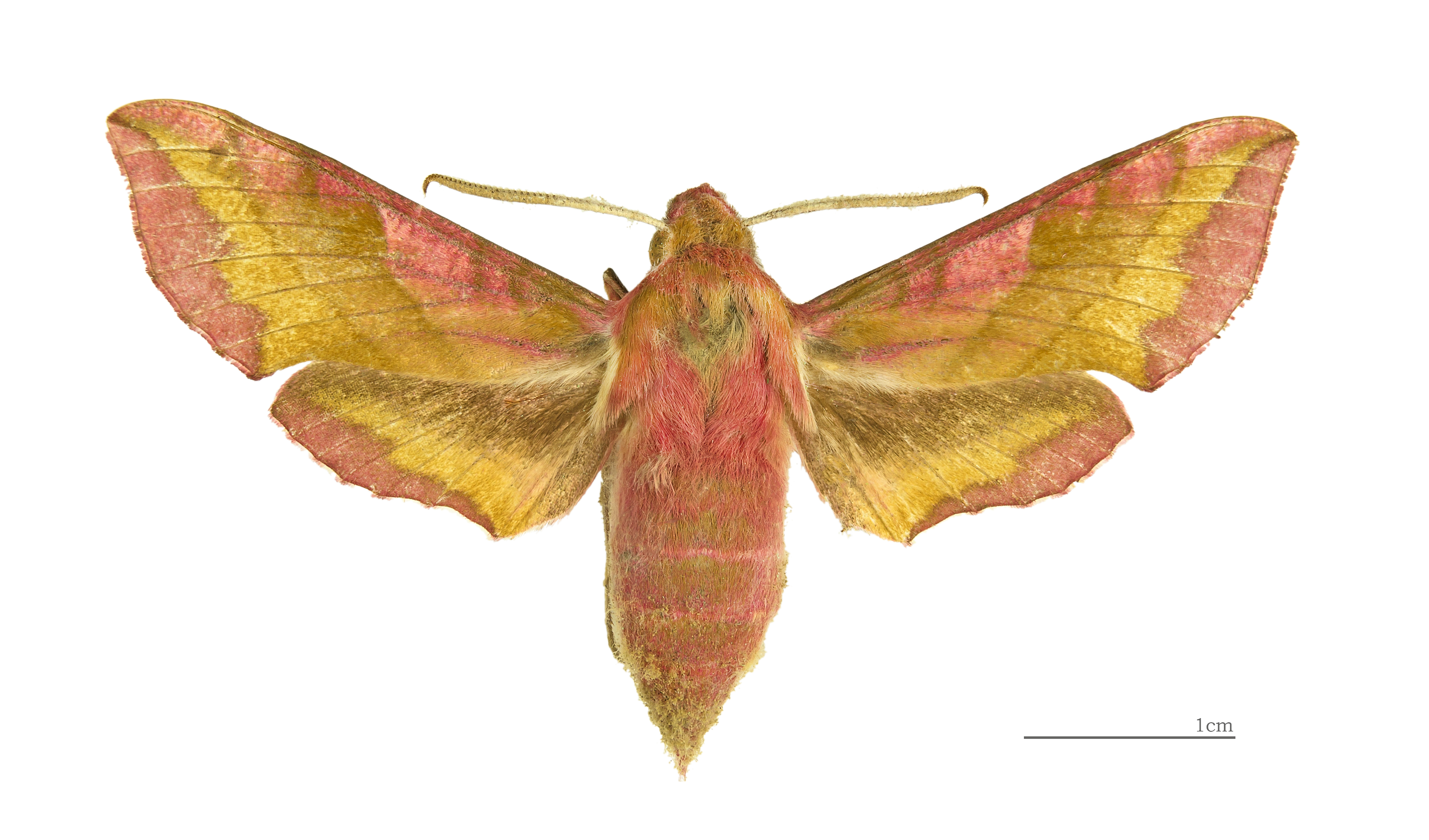
Deilephila porcellus ♂ MHNT

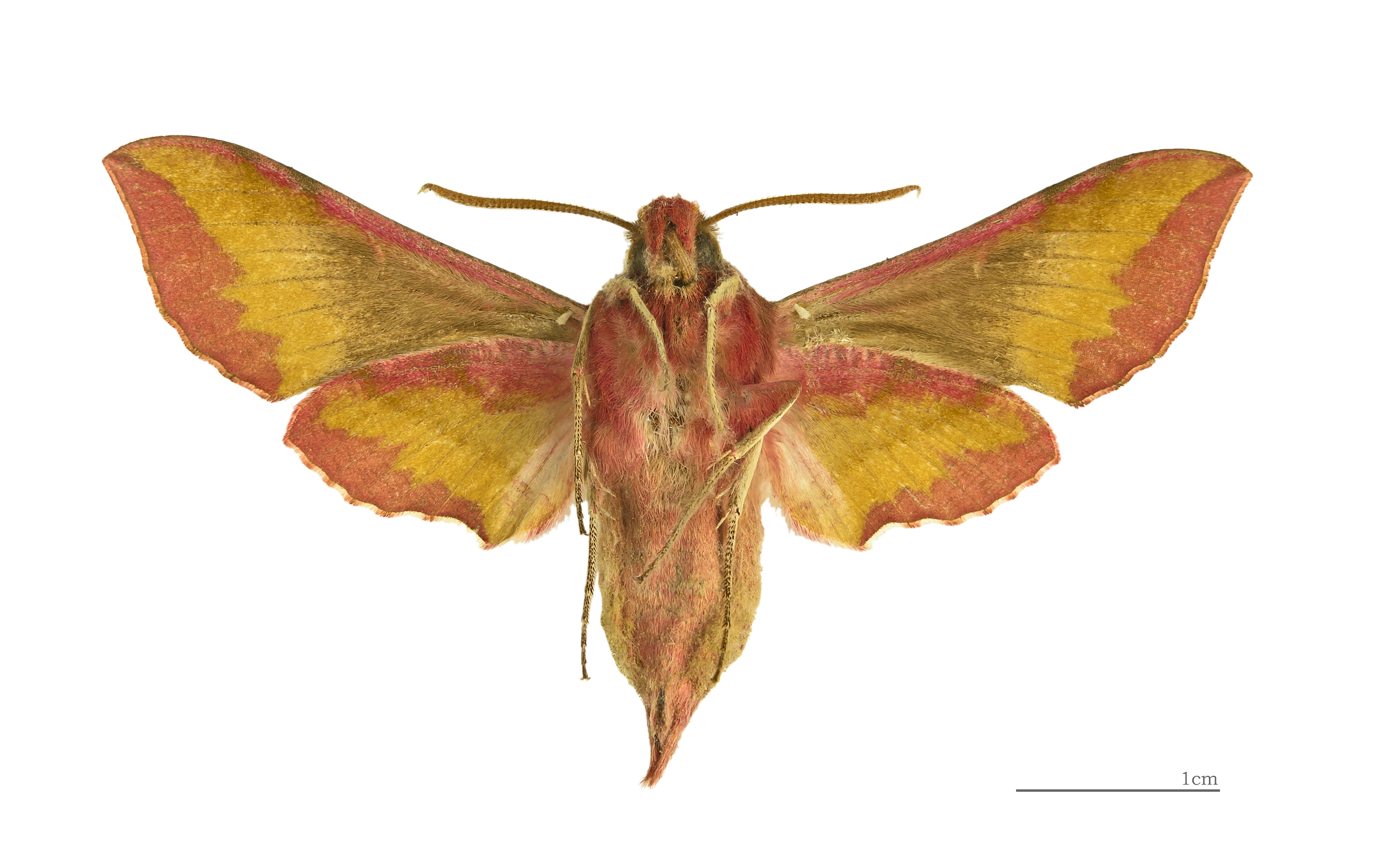
Deilephila porcellus ♂ △ MHNT

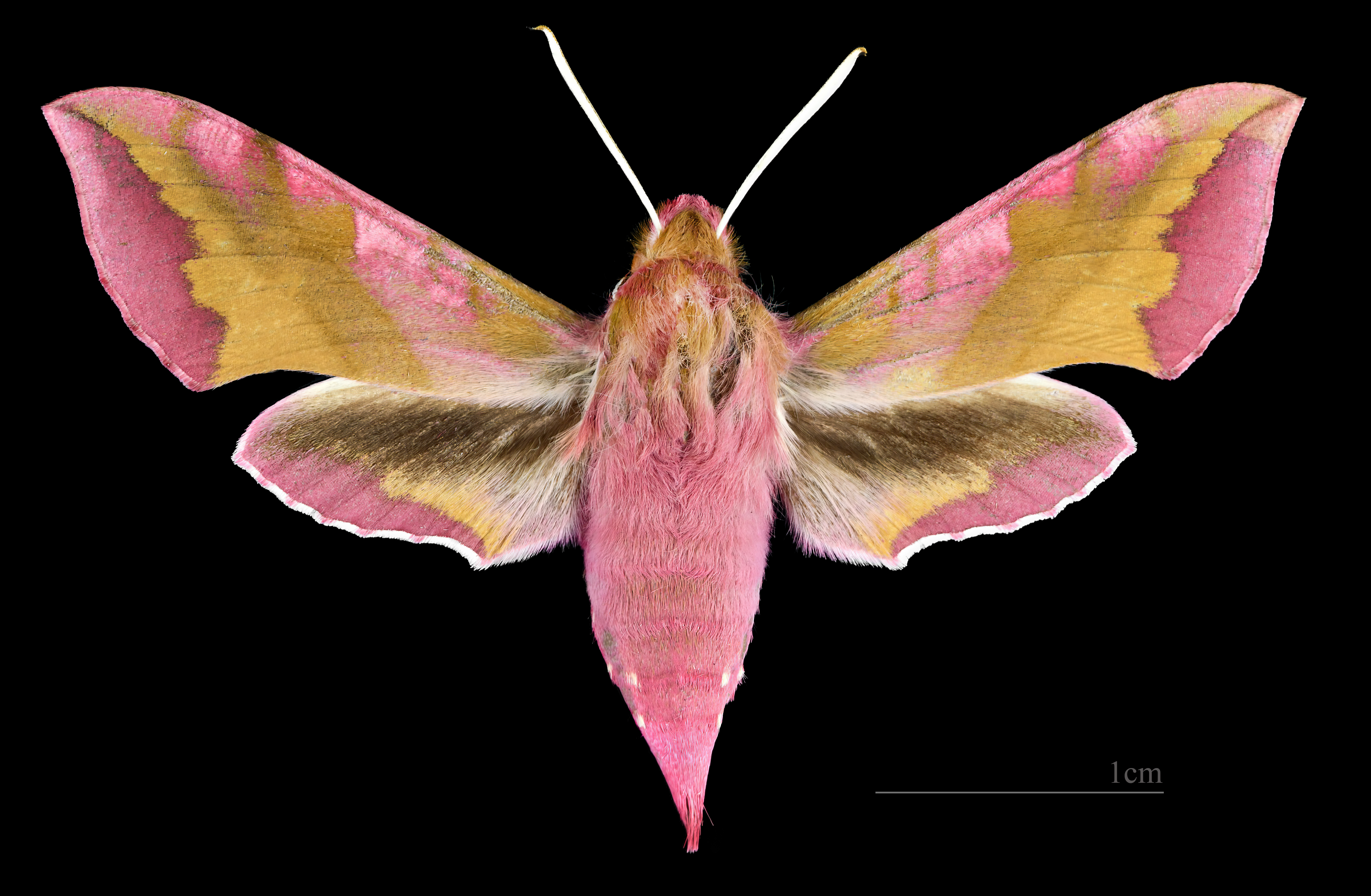
Deilephila porcellus ♀ MHNT

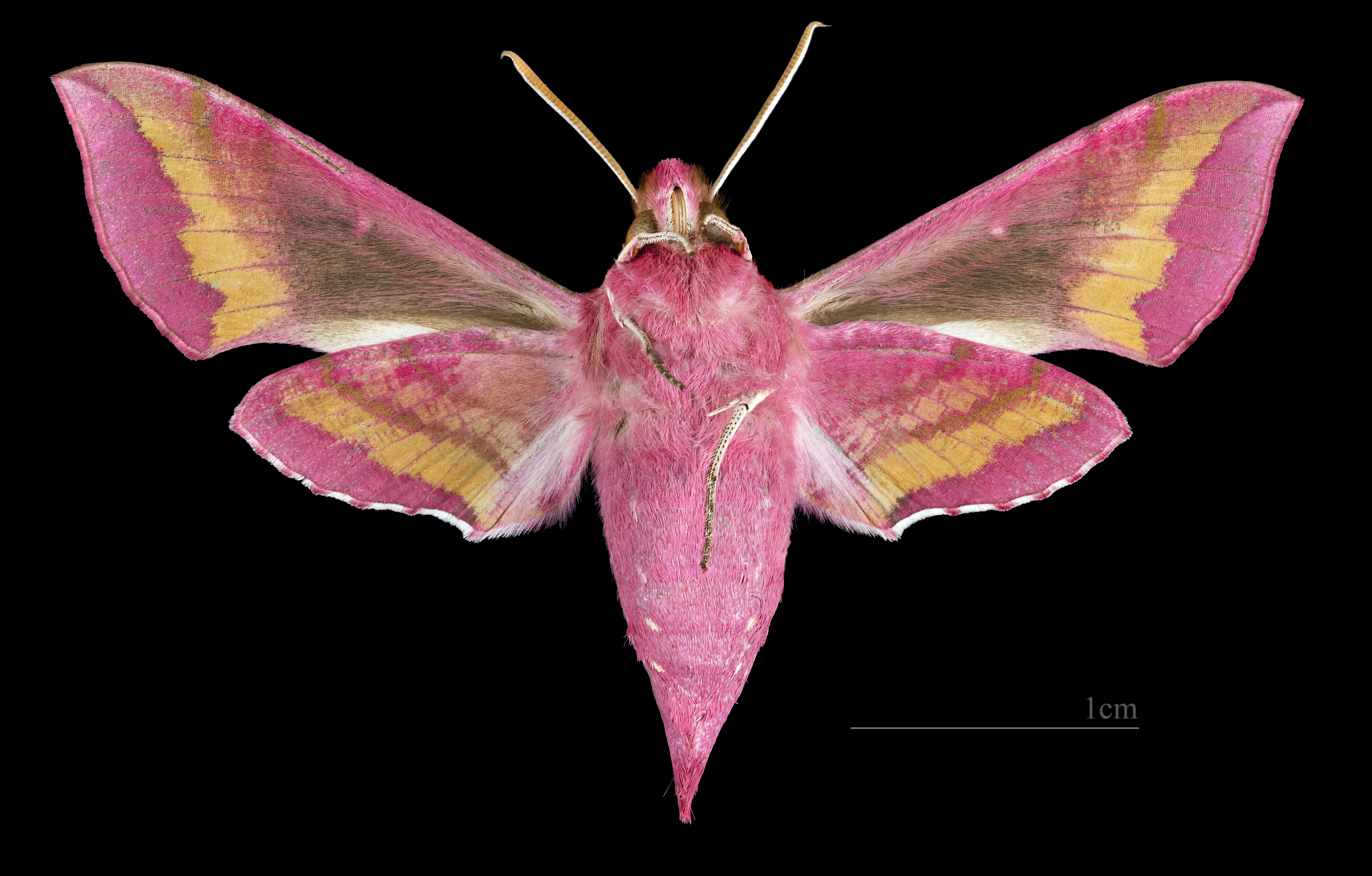
Deilephila porcellus ♀△ MHNT

The larva is greyish brown or darker grey, merging into yellowish brown on the front rings. The head is greyer than the body. The usual sphingid horn is absent, and in its place there is a double wart. In the early instars the caterpillar is pale greyish green with blackish bristles, and the head and under surface are yellowish.

The larvae feed on Galium and Epilobium.

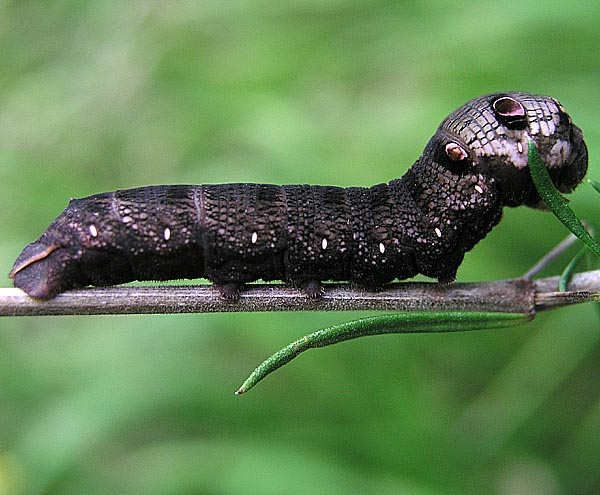
Caterpillar

== Similar species ==
D. porcellus is often confused with Deilephila elpenor, the elephant hawk moth. D. porcellus is the smaller of the two species, and other characteristics in size and coloring can be used to distinguish between the two. For example, D. porcellus has more yellow around its body and lacks the thick pink stripe that goes down D. elpenor's abdomen.

== Ecology ==
It is found in Europe coastal areas, heaths and meadowland edges where Galium is present. Up to 1600 m in the Alps and Spain but in North Africa, Turkey up to 2000 m. In central Iran and central Asia open, arid montane forest, or scrub. Usually found at 2000 to 2500 m.
