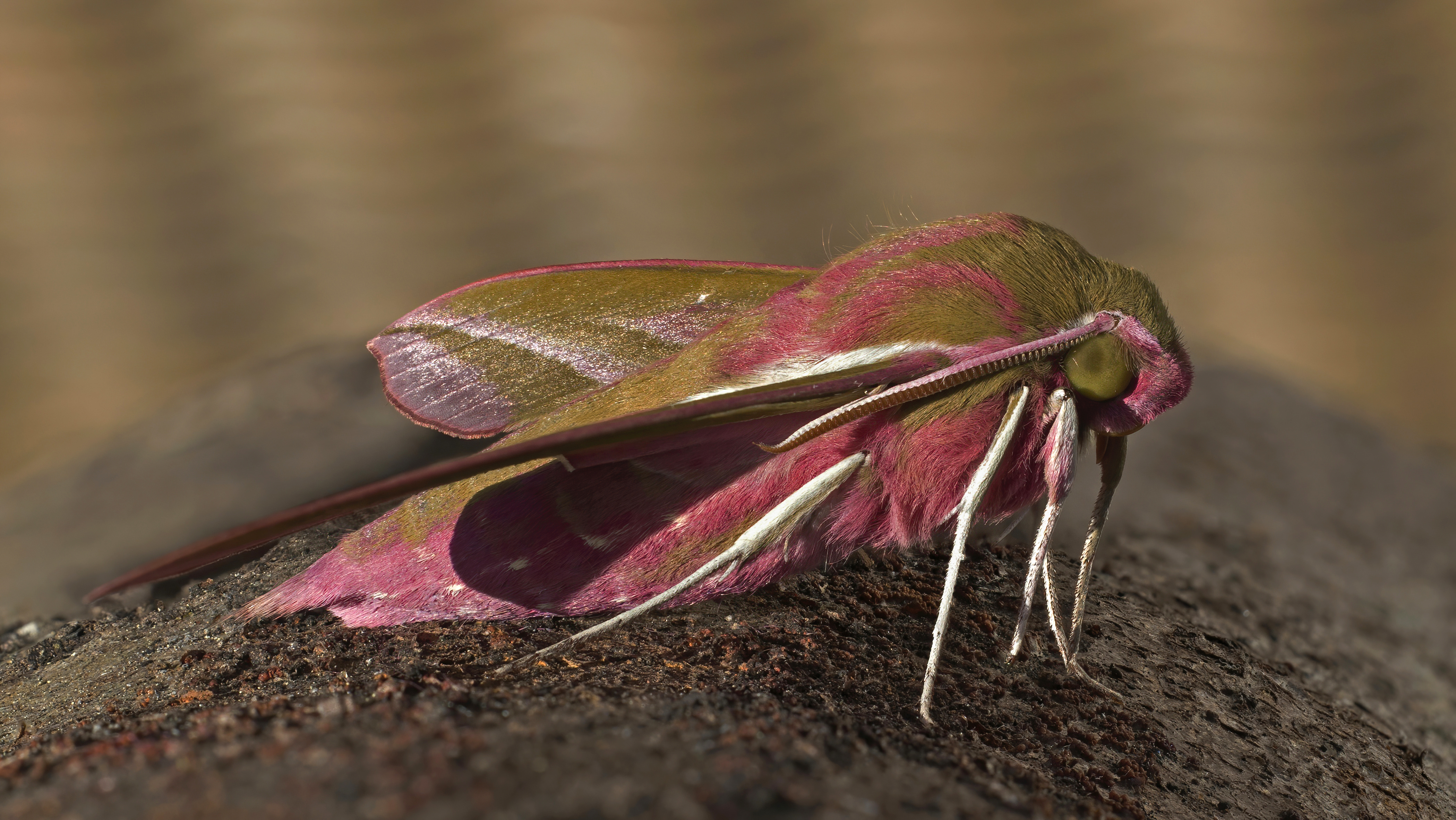

Conservation status
- Least Concern (IUCN 3.1)

Scientific classification
- Kingdom: Animalia
- Phylum: Arthropoda
- Clade: Pancrustacea
- Class: Insecta
- Order: Lepidoptera
- Family: Sphingidae
- Genus: Deilephila
- Species: D. elpenor

Binomial name
- Deilephila elpenor (Linnaeus, 1758)

Synonyms
- List: Sphinx elpenor Linnaeus, 1758; Chaerocampa lewisii Butler, 1875; Elpenor vitis Oken, 1815; Chaerocampa elpenor alboradiata Lambillion, 1913; Chaerocampa elpenor cinerescens Newnham, 1900; Deilephila elpenor argentea Burrau, 1950; Deilephila elpenor philippsi Niepelt, 1921; Deilephila elpenor tristis Lempke & Stolk, 1986; Deilephila elpenor vautrini Austaut, 1907; Eumorpha elpenor clara Tutt, 1904; Eumorpha elpenor obsoleta Tutt, 1904; Eumorpha elpenor pallida Tutt, 1904; Eumorpha elpenor unicolor Tutt, 1904; Eumorpha elpenor virgata Tutt, 1904; Pergesa elpenor daubi Niepelt, 1908; Pergesa elpenor distincta Meyer, 1969; Pergesa elpenor hades Rebel, 1910; Pergesa elpenor lugens Niepelt, 1926; Pergesa elpenor scheiderbaueri Gschwandner, 1924; Pergesa elpenor szechuana Chu & Wang, 1980

= Deilephila elpenor =

Elephant hawk moth
- Dorsal or upperside view

Species of moth

Deilephila elpenor, the elephant hawk moth or large elephant hawk moth, is a moth in the family Sphingidae. Its common name is derived from the caterpillar's resemblance to an elephant's trunk. It is most common in Central Europe and is distributed throughout the Palearctic region. It has also been introduced in British Columbia, Canada. Its distinct olive and pink colouring makes it one of the most recognisable moths in its range, but confusing the elephant hawk moth with the small elephant hawk moth, a closely related species that also shares the characteristic colours, is quite common.

These moths are nocturnal, so feed on flowers that open or produce nectar at night. The elephant hawk moth has very sensitive eyes that allow it to see colour even at low light, and it was one of the first species in which nocturnal colour vision was documented in animals. The moth is also known for its hovering capability, which it uses when feeding on nectar from flowers. This behaviour is costly in terms of energy and can help explain why the moth has evolved such enhanced visual capabilities for efficient feeding. The moths also have an important role as pollinators throughout their habitat.

== Description ==
The D. elpenor moth has olive-brown-coloured forewings outlined with pink. Two pink lines also run through the wings. The first line is usually thicker and terminates in the center of the wings near a white dot. The second line, which runs below the first, starts at the white inner margins and runs to the tip of the wing. The hindwings have a black inner half that gradually turns pink from the middle outwards. It is outlined by white fringes. The head, thorax, and body are also olive-brown in colour with pink markings throughout.

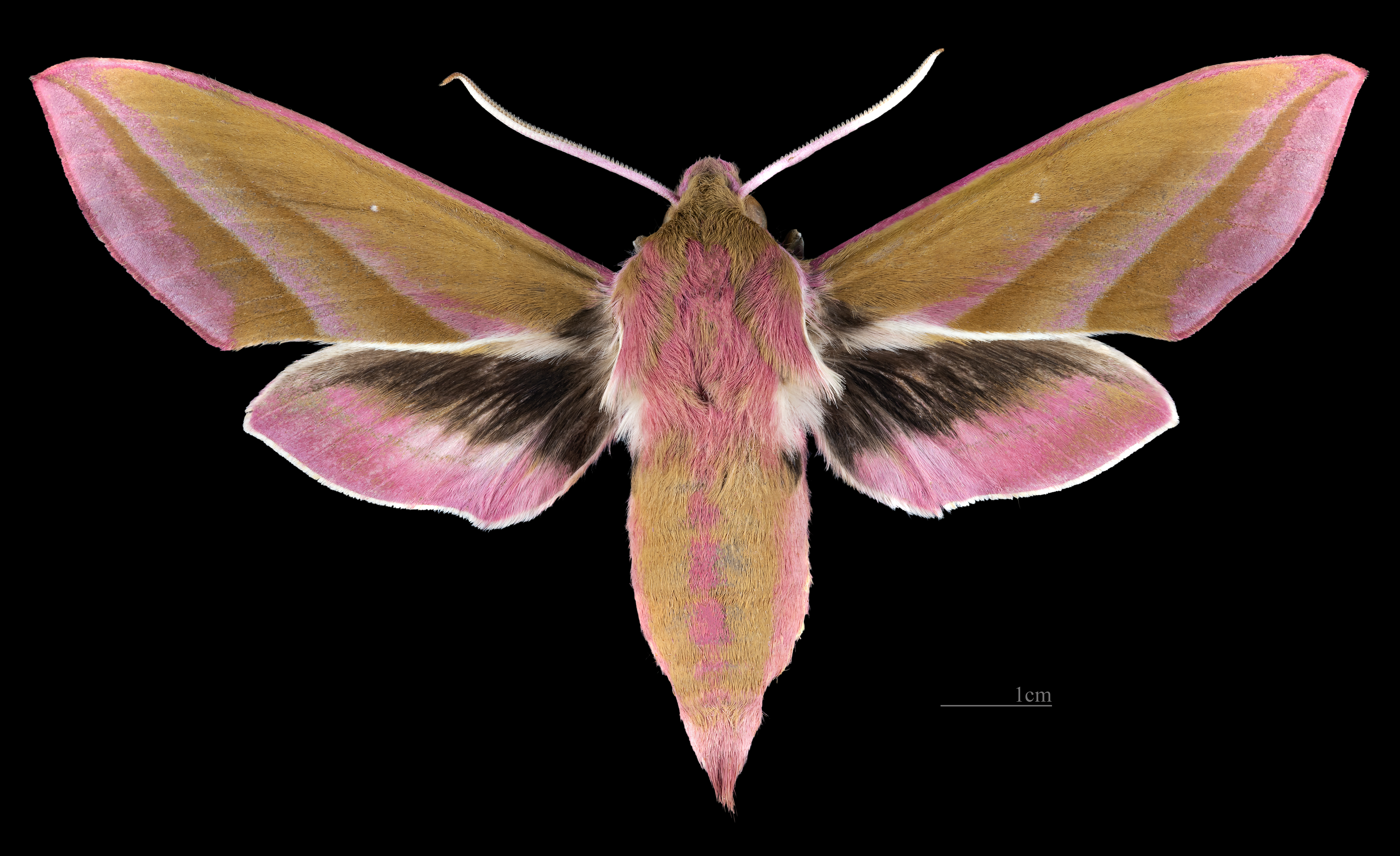
Male dorsal view

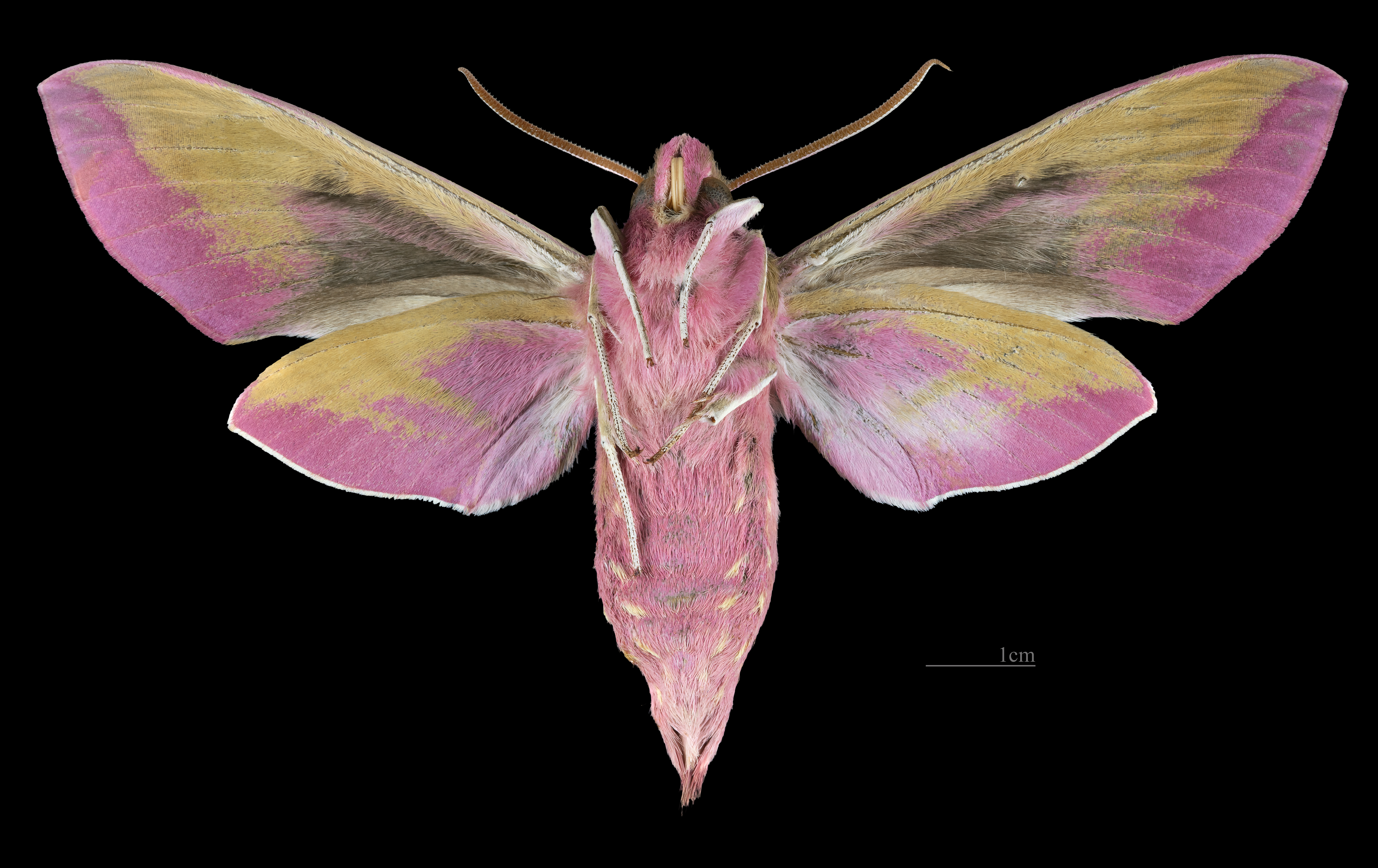
Male ventral view

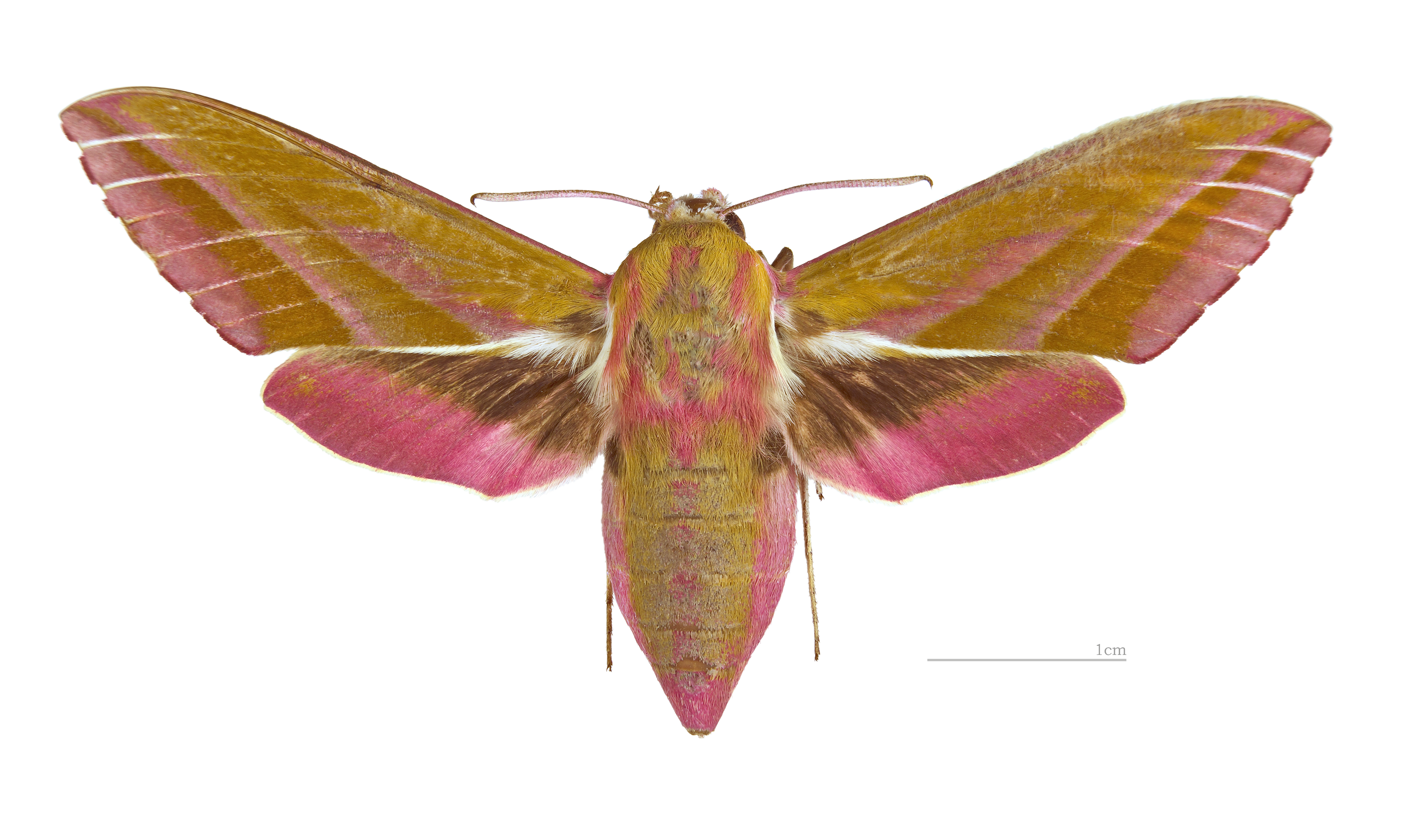
Female dorsal view

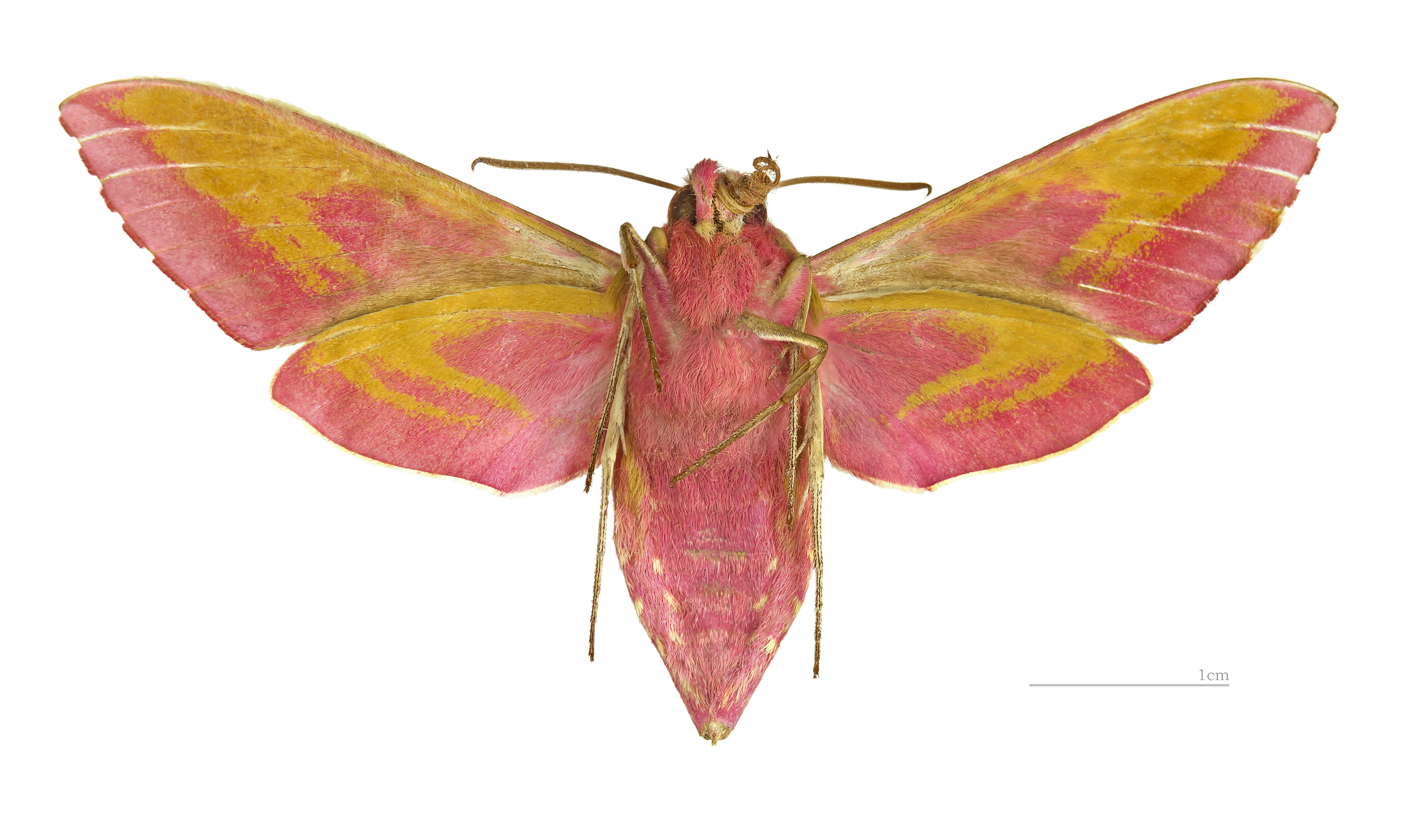
Female ventral view

== Subspecies ==
Two separate subspecies, D. e. elpenor and D. e. lewisii, were recognised in the past, but they are no longer regarded as well-distinguished. Similarly, the subspecies D. e. szechuana is now thought to be a synonym for D. e. elpenor. The subspecies D. e. macromera, found in southern China, northern India, Bhutan, and Myanmar, is still regarded as distinct.

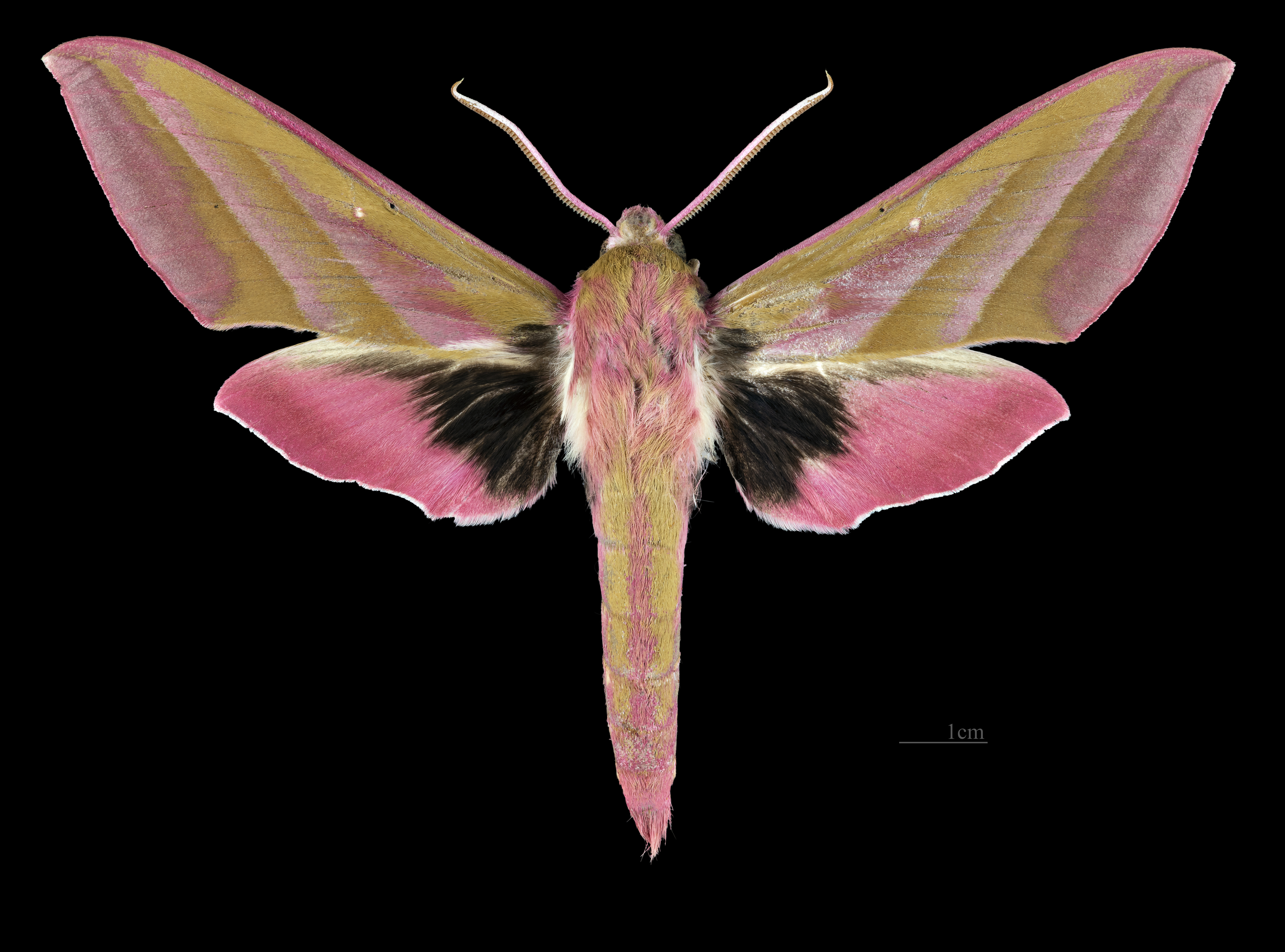
Male D. e. macromera, dorsal view

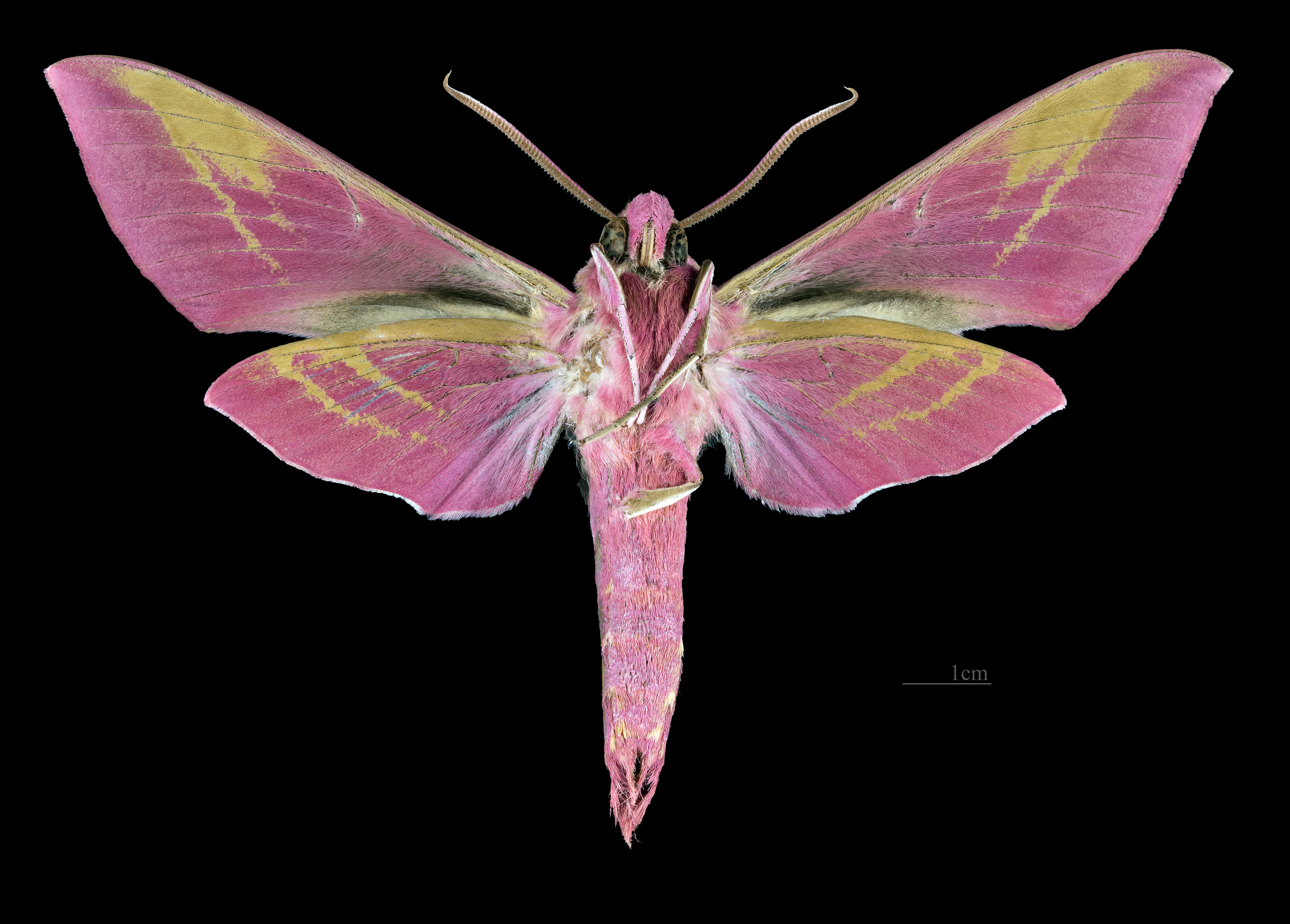
Male D. e. macromera, ventral view

== Similar species ==
The elephant hawk moth is often confused with the small elephant hawk moth (D. porcellus). Clear distinctions in size and colouring can help differentiate between the two. As the name suggests, the small elephant hawk moth is much smaller. It is also more yellow in colour around its body. The most obvious defining feature is the thick, pink stripe going down the elephant hawk moth's abdomen that is missing on the small elephant hawk moth's abdomen. The two species are not usually seen together in garden traps because the small elephant hawk moth prefers more open habitats.

== Range ==
D. elpenor is very common in Central Europe and has a distribution throughout the Palearctic region. The species is especially well-distributed in England, Wales, and Ireland. Until the 1980s, D. elpenor was only present in the southern half of Scotland, but now it has made its way along the north coast and into the country's mainland, as well. In general, the moth's range becomes thinner and less concentrated in the northern parts of Europe. The range also extends throughout Asia and even to Japan.

== Habitat ==
D. elpenor inhabits a variety of habitats, including rough grassland, heathland, sand dunes, hedgerows, woodland, open countryside, and even urban gardens. The moths play an important role in pollination throughout their habitats. For example, previous studies on hawk moths have indicated that they can pollinate up to 5–10% of the tree and shrub species in the area they inhabit.

== Life cycle ==
Usually, only a single generation of D. elpenor occurs in a year. Only rarely, a small number of second-generation individuals in a single year can be recorded in the late summer. The pupae overwinter in cocoons, and the adults become active from May to early August. Its peak activity time is between June and September.

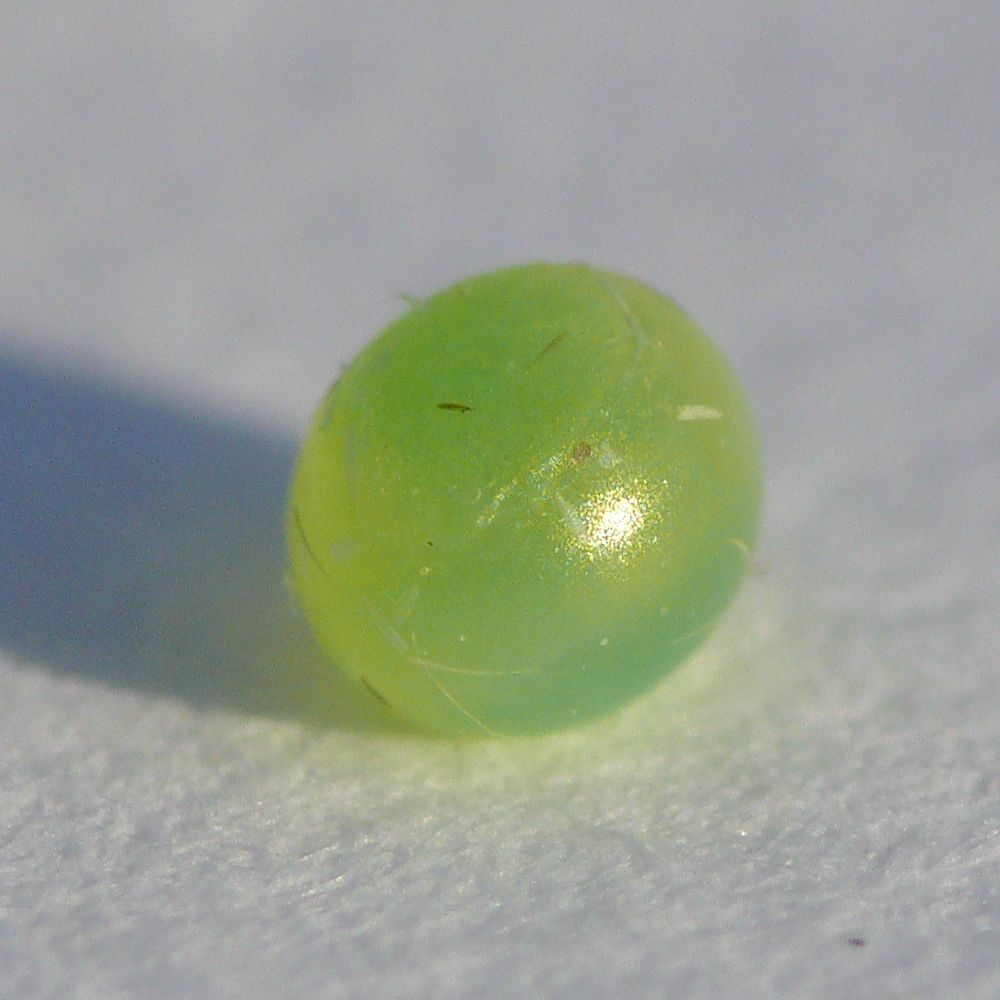
Egg

=== Egg ===
The females lay eggs either singly or in pairs on the leaves of plants that can act as food sources to the caterpillars when they emerge. These include rosebay willowherb (Chamaenerion angustifolium) and bedstraws (of the genus Galium). The moths are also attracted to gardens, and eggs have frequently been found on garden fuchsias, dahlias, and lavender. The eggs are whitish-green and have a glossy texture. Eggs usually hatch in 10 days.

=== Larva ===
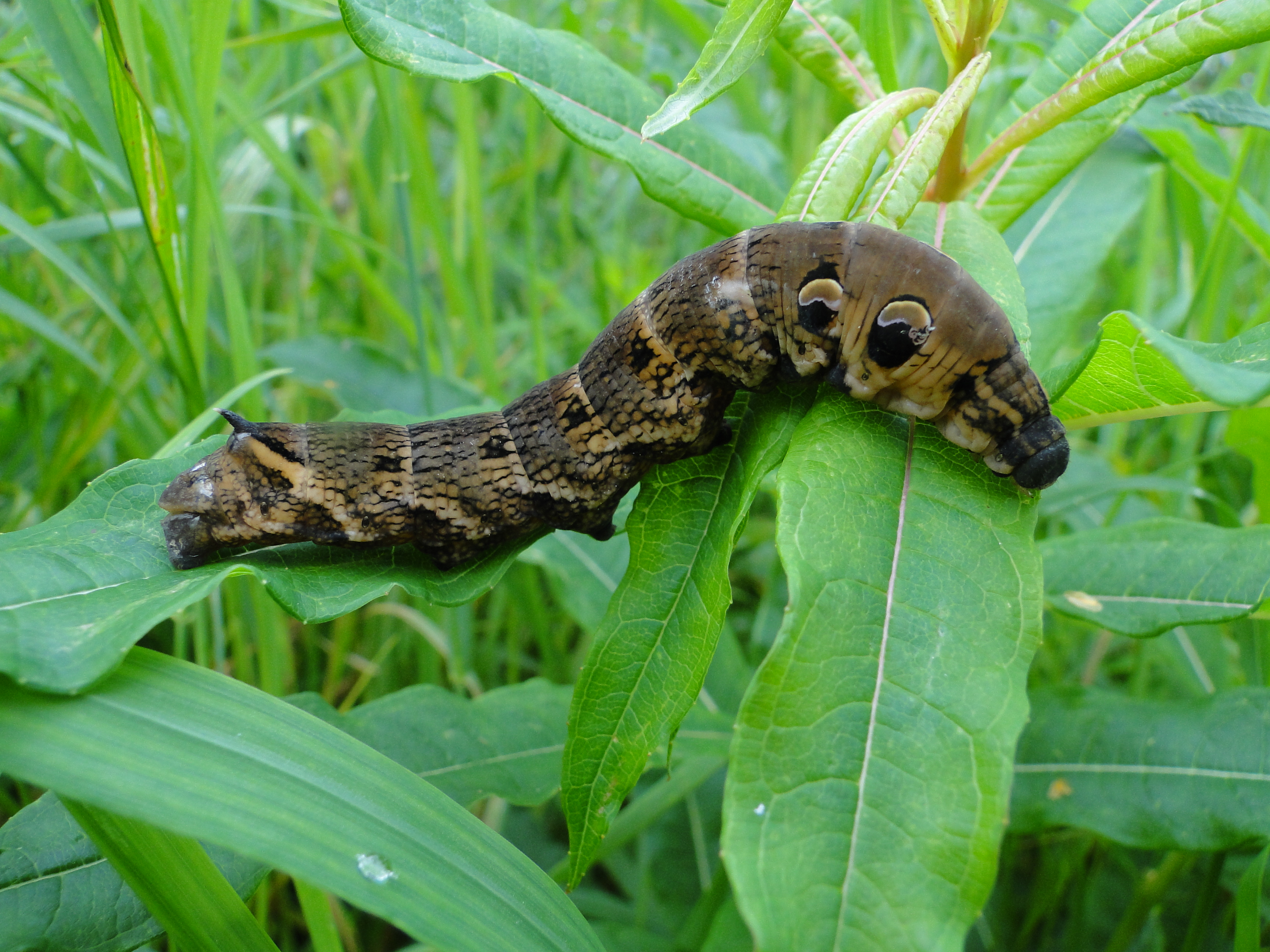
Larva

Young larvae are a yellowish white to green colour. When they have finished growing, the larvae are a brown-gray colour with black dots along the length of the body. Larvae have a backward-curving spine or "horn" that is the same colour as their body on the final abdominal segment. Fully grown larvae can measure up to 3 inches (7.62 cm) in length. They also weigh between 4.0 and 7.5 grams (0.14 and 0.26 oz); during their lifetime, they ingest 11–30 grams (0.39–1.06 oz) of plant material.

Variation in colour has been observed in nature. Specifically, a green version of the full-grown larva exists within the species. Previous research has shown that the colour variation is not due to a simple inheritance pattern, and specific explanations still remain inconclusive.

=== Pupa ===
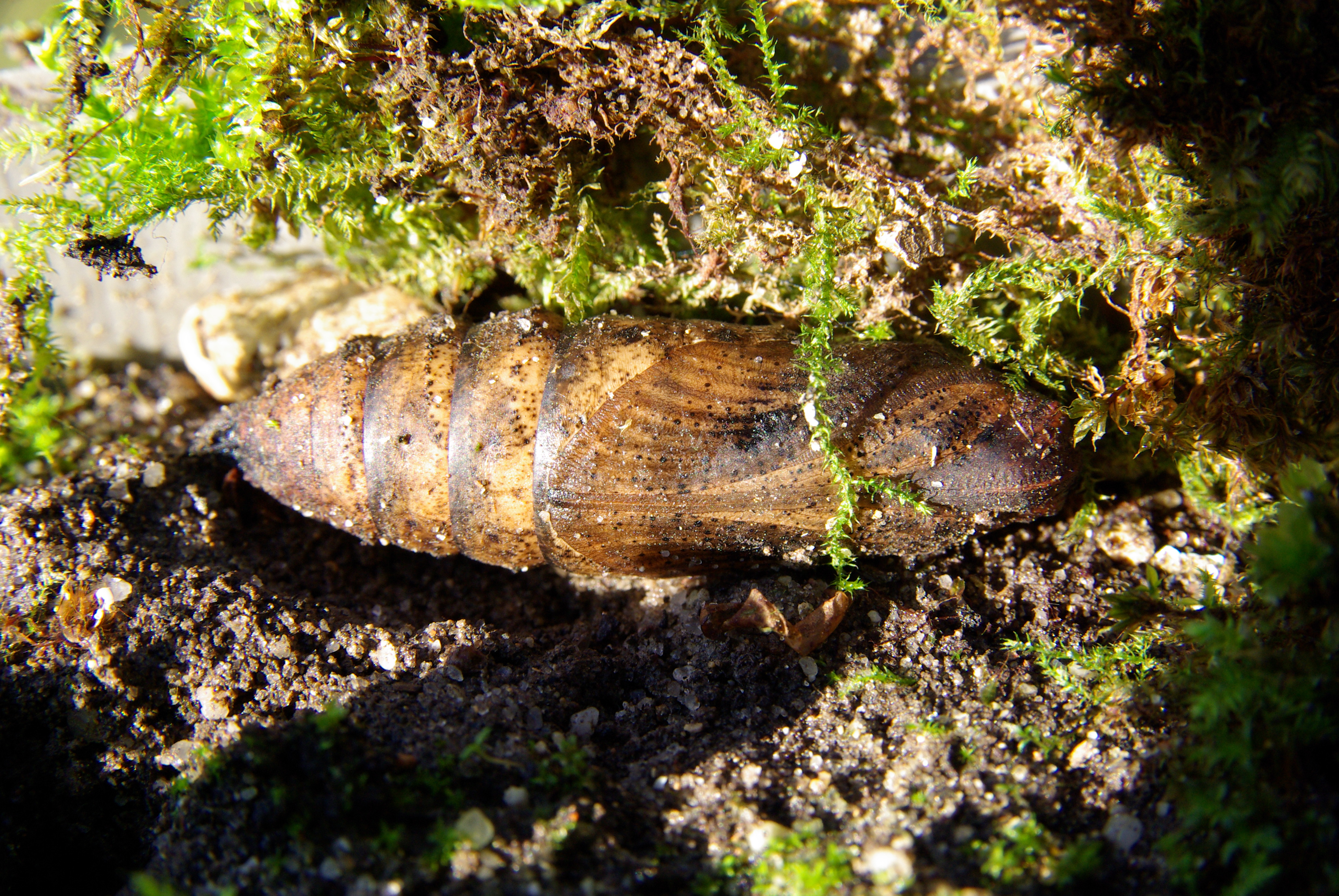
Pupa

D. elpenor moves from the larval to the pupal stage in around 27 days. When the larvae are fully grown, they look for a place to pupate, usually at the base of a plant in plant debris or underground. Once they have found a secure spot, they line the pupal chamber with a few strands of silk, then overwinter as pupae. The pupae are brown with darker brown speckles throughout, and the divisions between the segments appear black. Pupae are 40–45 millimetres (1.6–1.8 in) long.

=== Adult ===
The wingspan of D. elpenor in Europe measure around 60–70 millimetres (2.4–2.8 in). Very little variation is seen between the male and female D. elpenor. Adults are the most active during June. They visit flowers and feed on the nectar at night, and are especially attracted to plants such as honeysuckle (Lonicera).

== Adaptations ==
=== Eyespots ===
Many Lepidoptera species have evolved eyespots either on their body (when they are caterpillars) or on their wings (as fully grown adults). This dark, circular marking is generally thought to resemble the eyes of a predator and may deter attacks from birds that feed on insects. This mimicry is effective because the caterpillar is usually somewhat concealed, and because the predators must respond to the signals quickly.

When it feels threatened by a predator, the caterpillar widens the anterior part of its body. This defensive posture makes the eyespots more conspicuous. This may allow the eyespots of the caterpillar to resemble a snake more closely than when it is at rest.

== Mating ==
=== Pheromones ===
Experiments using gas chromatography and mass spectroscopy have identified (E)-11-hexadecenal and (10E, 12E)-10,12-hexadecadienal [(E,E)-bombykal] as the major components of the female sex pheromone. These pheromones are the most active when females are actively exhibiting calling behaviour and visibly showing their ovipositors.

== Vision ==
D. elpenor has very sensitive eyes that allow it to have colour vision even at night.The dark-adapted eyes of D.elpenor have been found to have three visual pigments with a maximal wavelength of 345, 440, and 520 nm. These values respectively correspond to ultraviolet, blue, and green wavelengths. Most vertebrates, such as humans, lose the ability to use the three types of photoreceptors present in the eye in dim light conditions. All three types of photoreceptors, though, remain functional in various light conditions for D. elpenor, giving it the ability to have scotopic colour vision. This species was the first instance in which night colour vision was documented in animals. Usually, increased colour sensitivity results in decreases in spatial resolution. However, despite the great sensitivity of its eyesight, the moth also has a reasonable spatial resolution. This night colour vision is necessary because of the moth's feeding patterns. D. elpenor feeds at the darkest hours of night and also hovers over the flower to suck its nectar out rather than sitting on the flower. Locating the correct flower and hovering over it are both visually demanding tasks.

== Feeding ==
D. elpenor feeds on nectar from flowers. When most insects forage, they land on the flower to retrieve the nectar, but D. elpenor hovers in front of the flower rather than landing on it. The moth then extends its long, straw-like proboscis to attain its food. While hovering, its wings beat at a high frequency to stabilise the body from the drift of the wind. This flight pattern is quite costly, so the moth must be able to feed effectively by knowing where to find nectar.

=== Visual cues ===
Since they are nocturnal, the moths tend to feed on flowers that open or produce nectar at twilight or during the night. These are commonly termed "hawkmoth flowers". D. elpenor is able to see colour, which is usually absent from most other nocturnal species. Their particular visual system allows them to discriminate between various wavelengths even at low illumination, allowing the moths to find correct food sources while foraging.

=== Olfactory cues ===
Olfaction also plays an important role in feeding for the moth. Many of the hawkmoth flowers contain a pleasant smell. Previous studies have found that fragrance release from the hawkmoth flowers stimulate flower-seeking behaviour by the moths. Therefore, both visual and olfactory cues are thought to play a role in the feeding behaviour of D. elpenor.

=== Learning ===
D. elpenor, like many other insects, can learn to adapt its behaviour to changing environmental conditions. Experiments have shown that it can discriminate between various visual stimuli (i.e. colour) and associate them with a food reward. This behaviour is especially important because the wrong decision when choosing a food source can prove to be costly in time and energy resources. The experiment was conducted through the use of differently coloured artificial flowers. When no reward in the form of nectar was given by the flower, the moth did not further participate in foraging behaviour with that particular flower. This demonstrated the moth's need to keep energy expenses as low as possible while foraging.

== Flight ==
Peak flight time for D. elpenor is between June and September. Since the species is nocturnal, the moth flies from dusk until the morning, then rest at one of its food sources until dusk comes again. The moth has a maximum flight speed of 4.5— 5.1 m/s. The wind confers mechanical resistance to the wings while flying. Therefore, winds have negative effects on the energy budget of the moth. As a result, D. elpenor stops visiting flowers at wind speeds starting at 3.0 m/s.

D. elpenor is particularly adept at hovering, which is a necessary skill for obtaining nectar. It uses spatial cues and motion-detecting neurons to steady itself.

== Predators ==
Some natural predators use bright colouring to attract its prey, which includes D. elpenor. The conspicuous body colouring of certain nocturnal invertebrates, such as the white forehead stripes on the brown huntsman spider, lures the flying moth to its predator.

Bats are also known to prey on the moth.

== Gallery ==
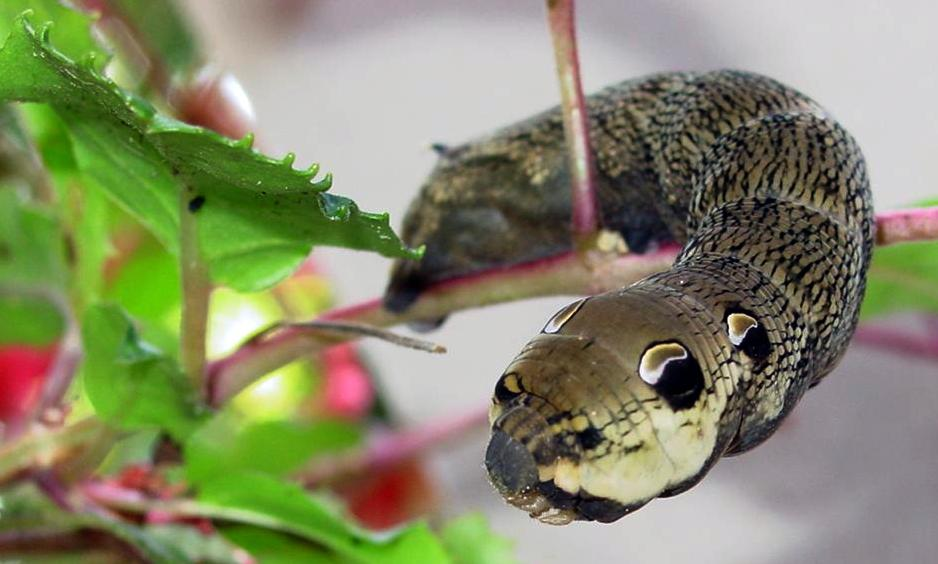
Larva

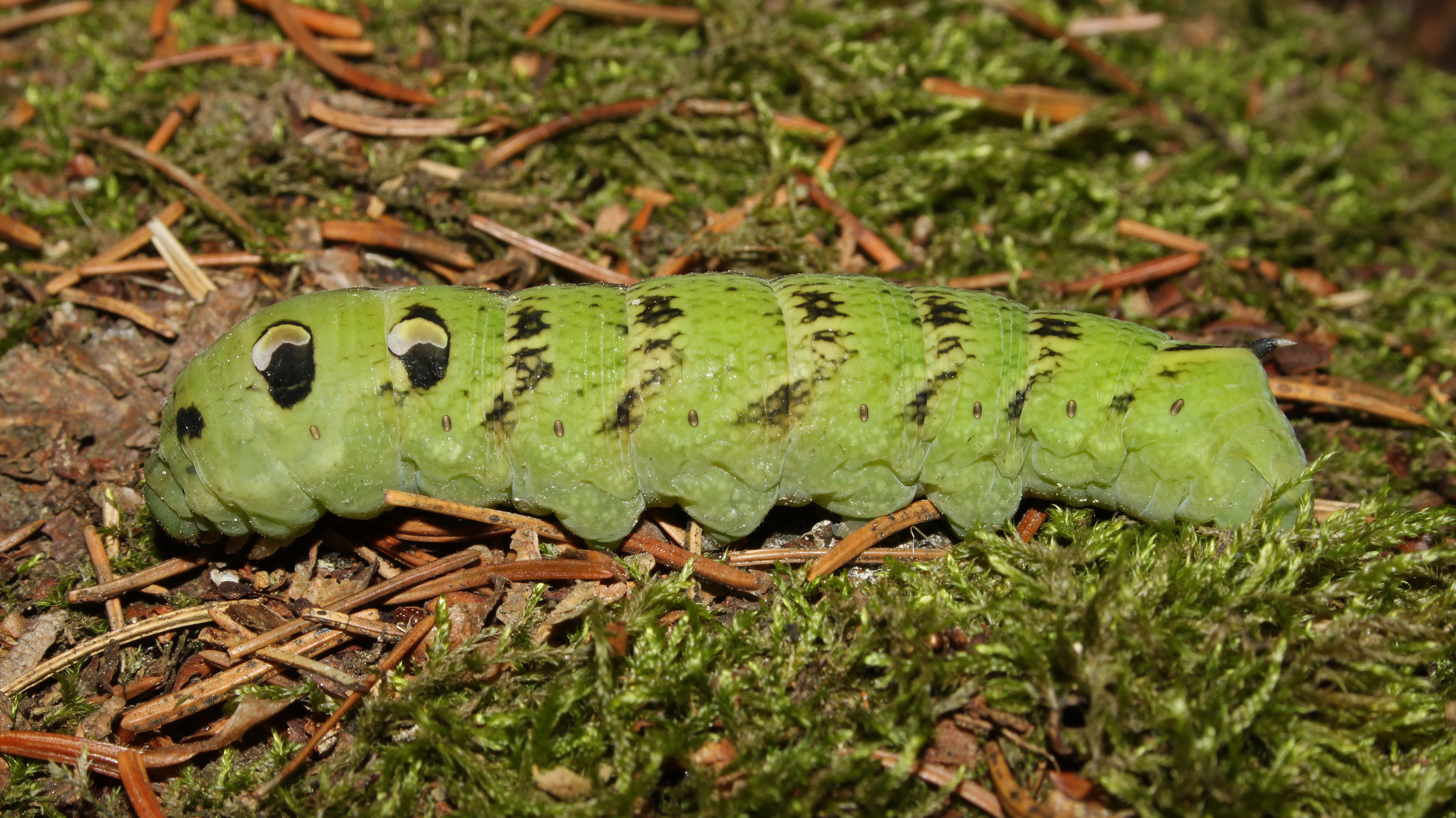
Green colour morph of the larva

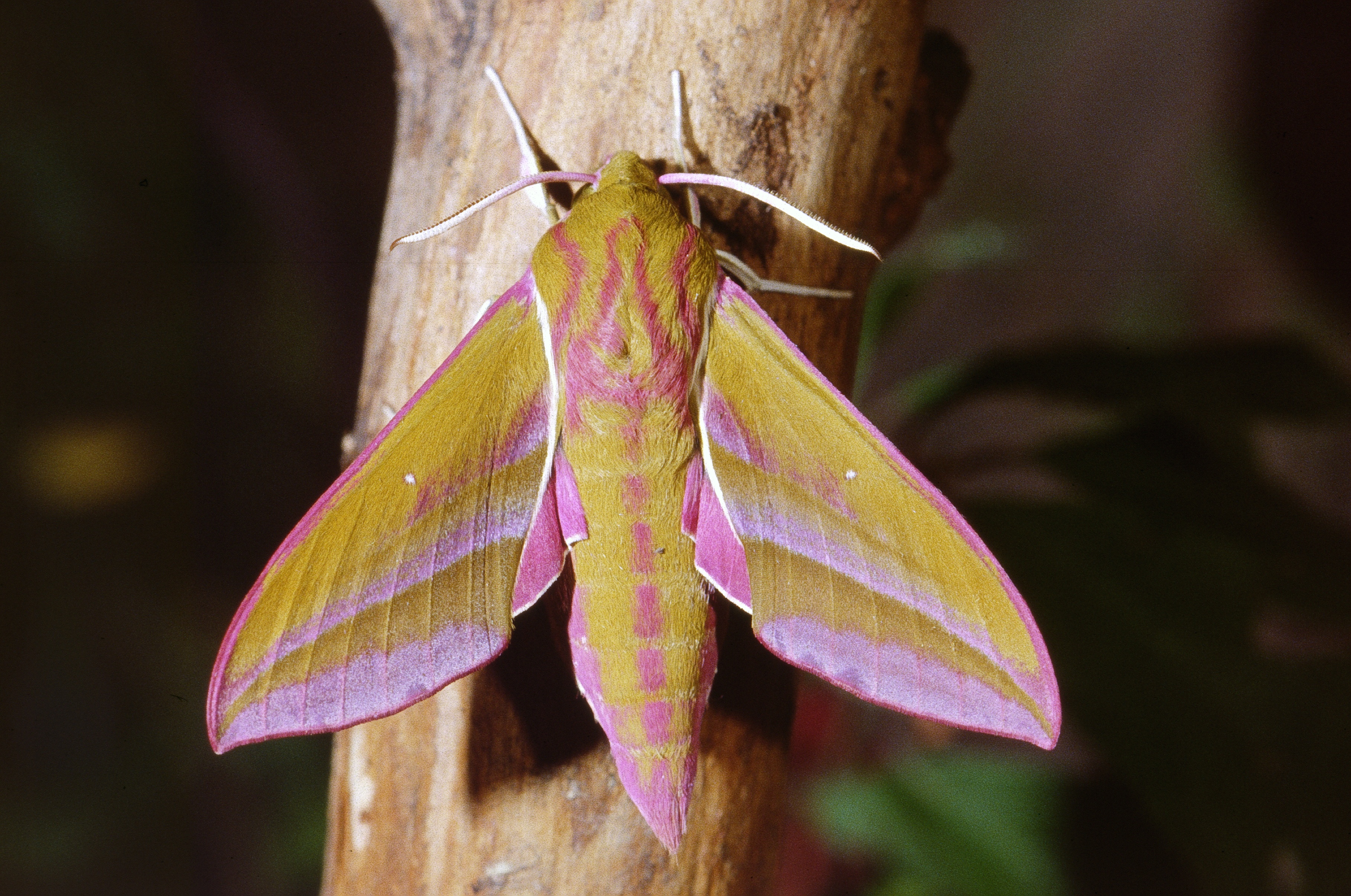
Adult

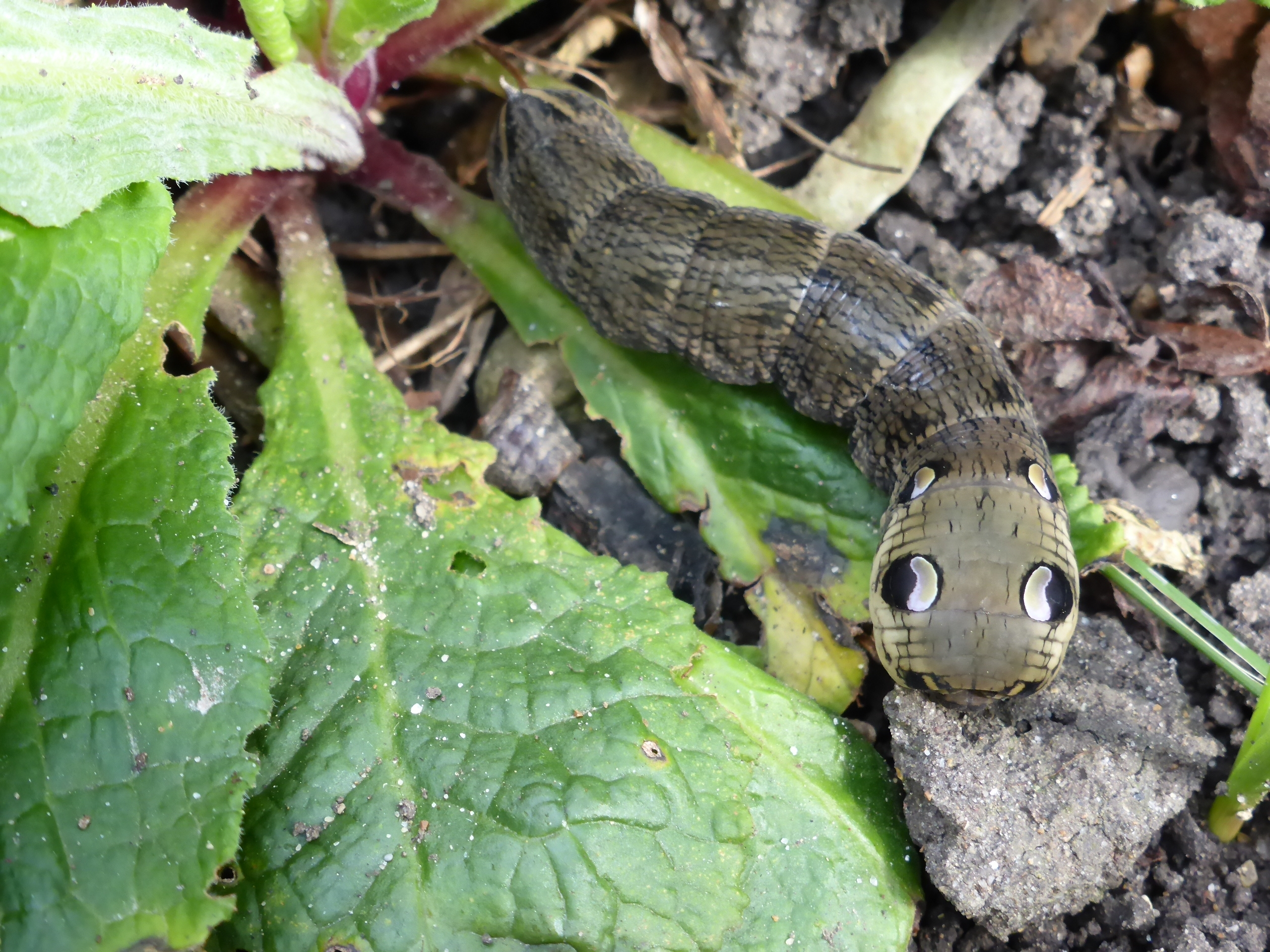
Eye markings of the larva

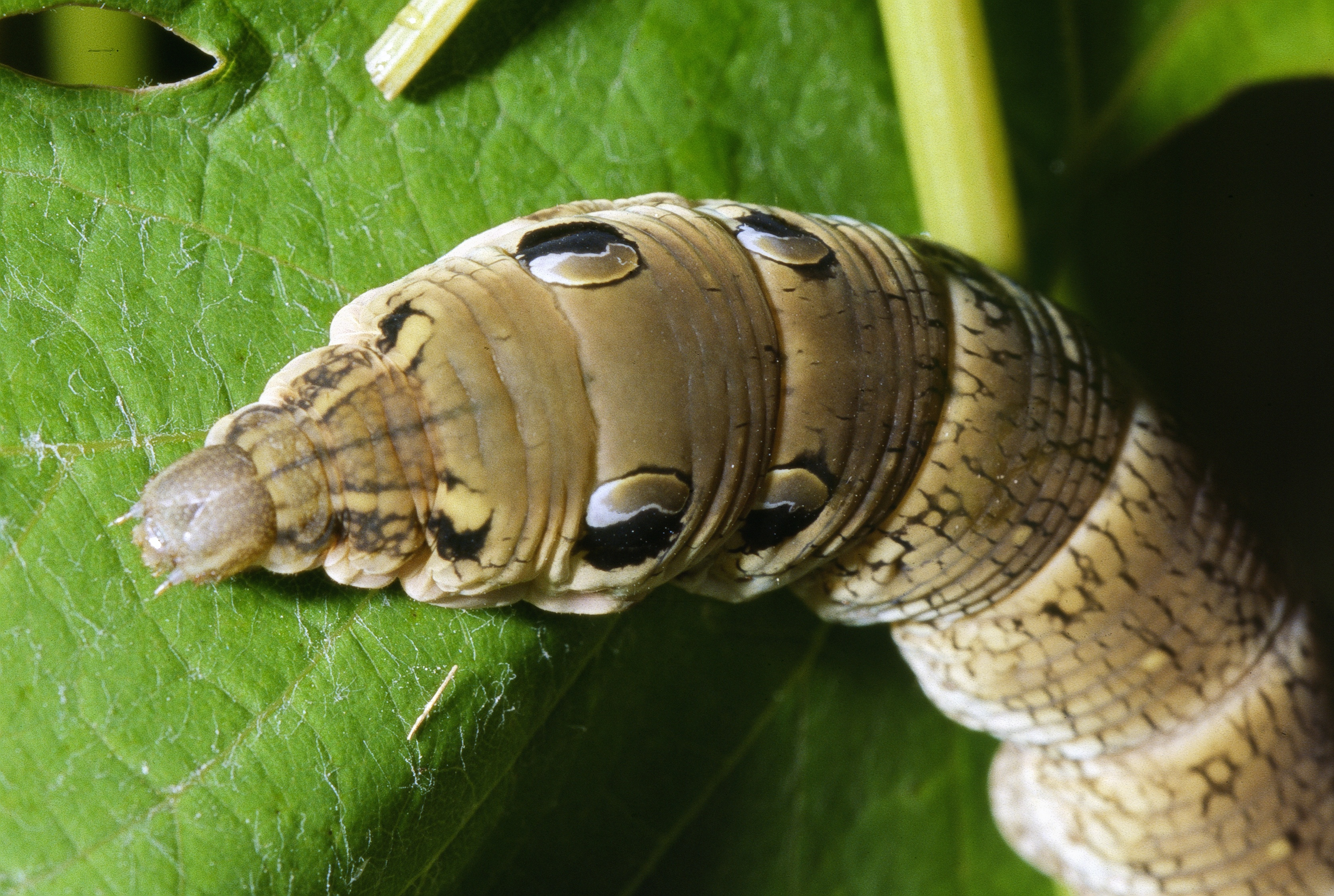
Eye markings on the larva

Video of the larva

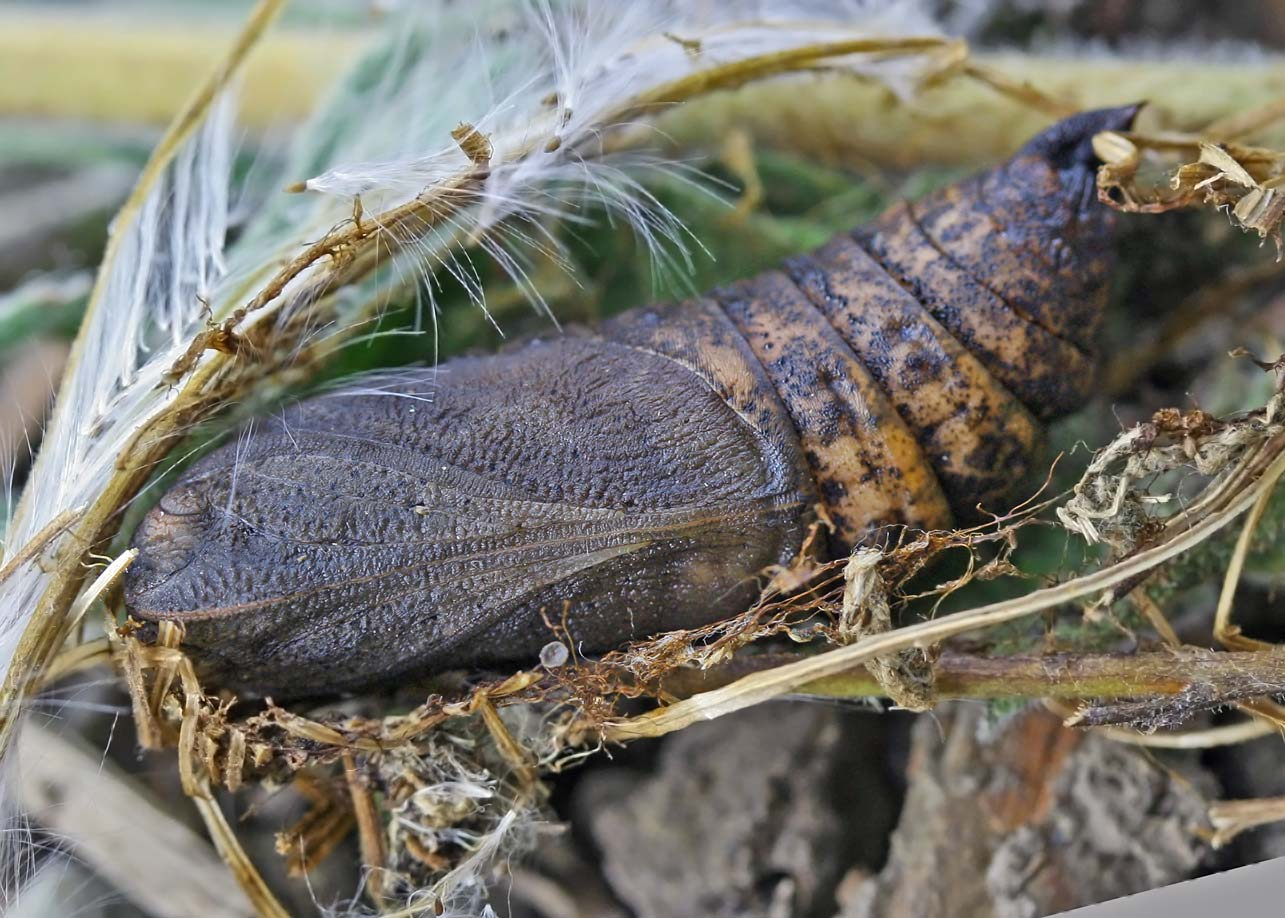
Pupa

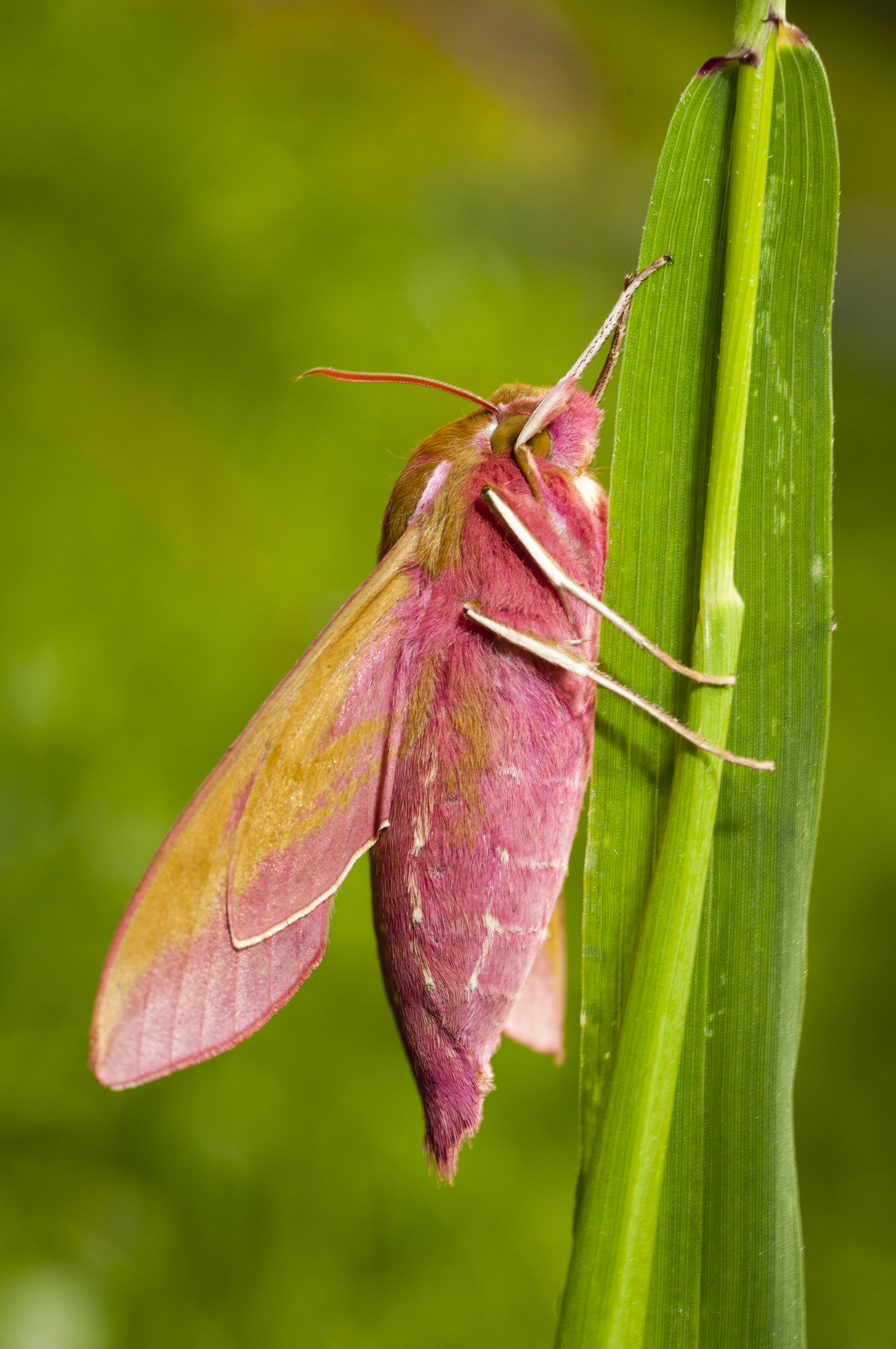
D. elpenor adult
