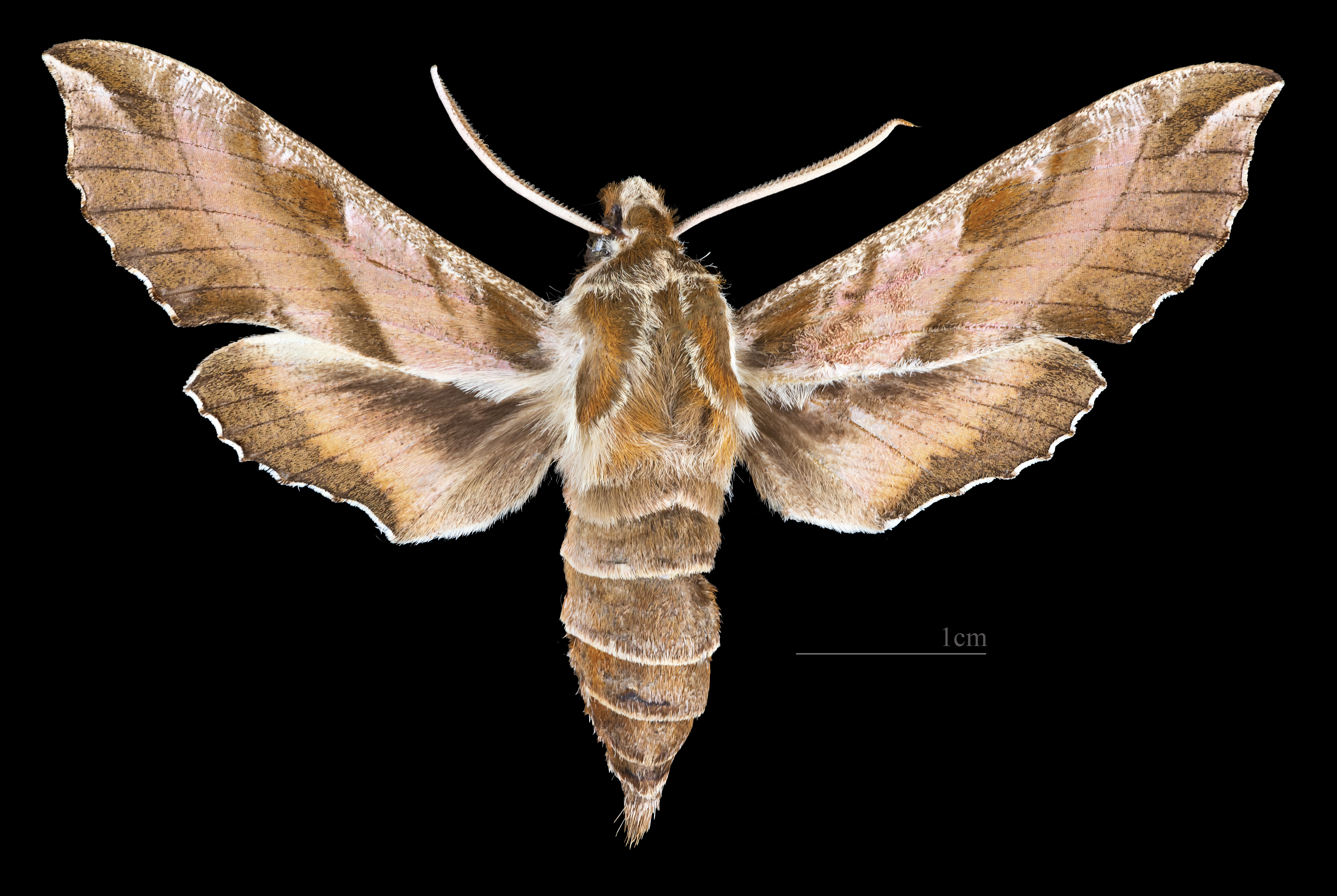
- Deilephila askoldensis ♂

Scientific classification
- Domain: Eukaryota
- Kingdom: Animalia
- Phylum: Arthropoda
- Class: Insecta
- Order: Lepidoptera
- Family: Sphingidae
- Genus: Deilephila
- Species: D. askoldensis

Binomial name
- Deilephila askoldensis (Oberthür, 1879)

Synonyms
- Smerinthus askoldensis Oberthür, 1879; Cinogon cingulatum Butler, 1881

= Deilephila askoldensis =

Species of moth

Deilephila askoldensis is a moth of the family Sphingidae.

== Distribution ==
It is found in southeastern Russia, northeastern China, the Korean Peninsula, and northern Japan.

== Description ==
D. askoldensis has a wingspan of 51–59 mm (2.0–2.3 in).

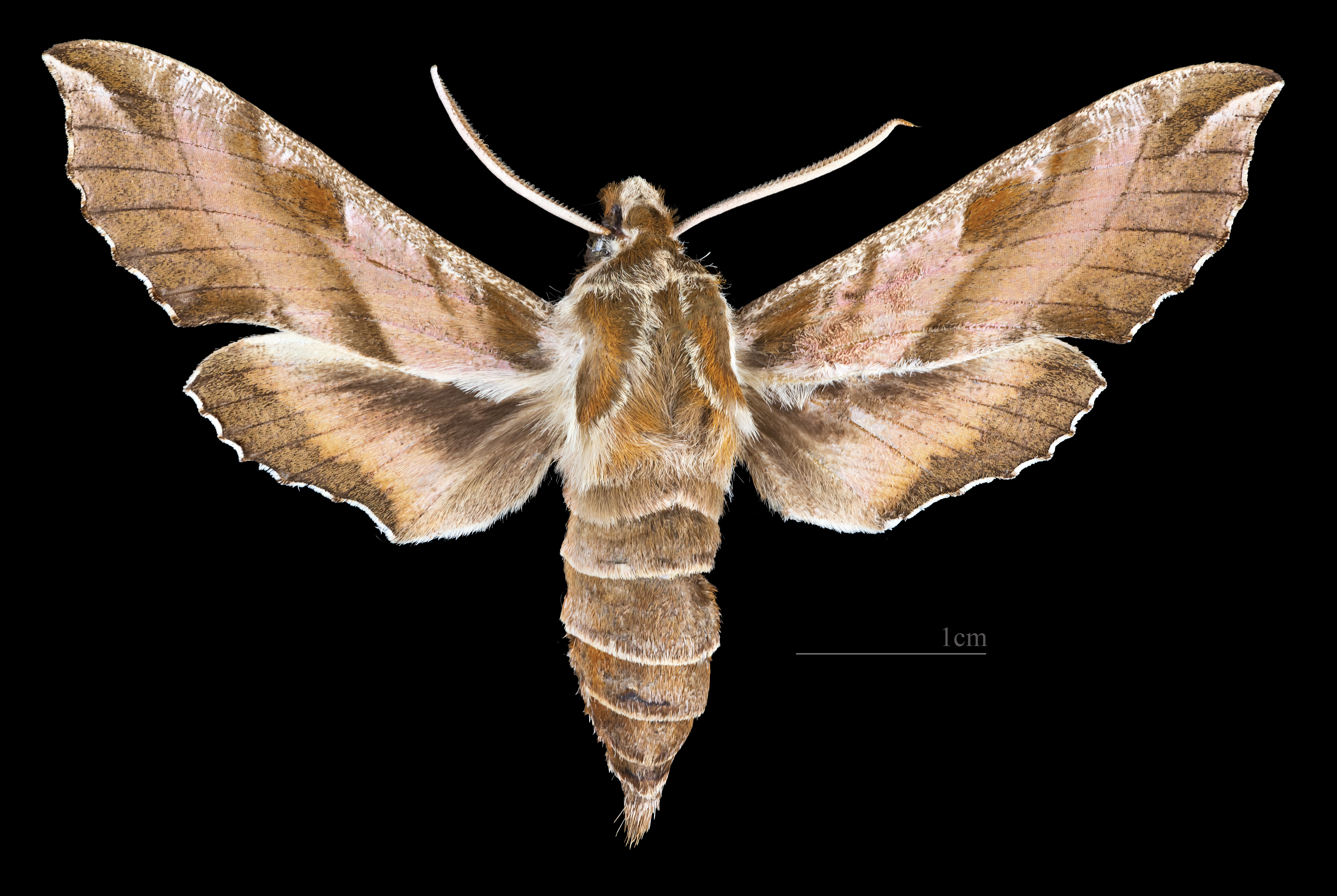
D. askoldensis ♂

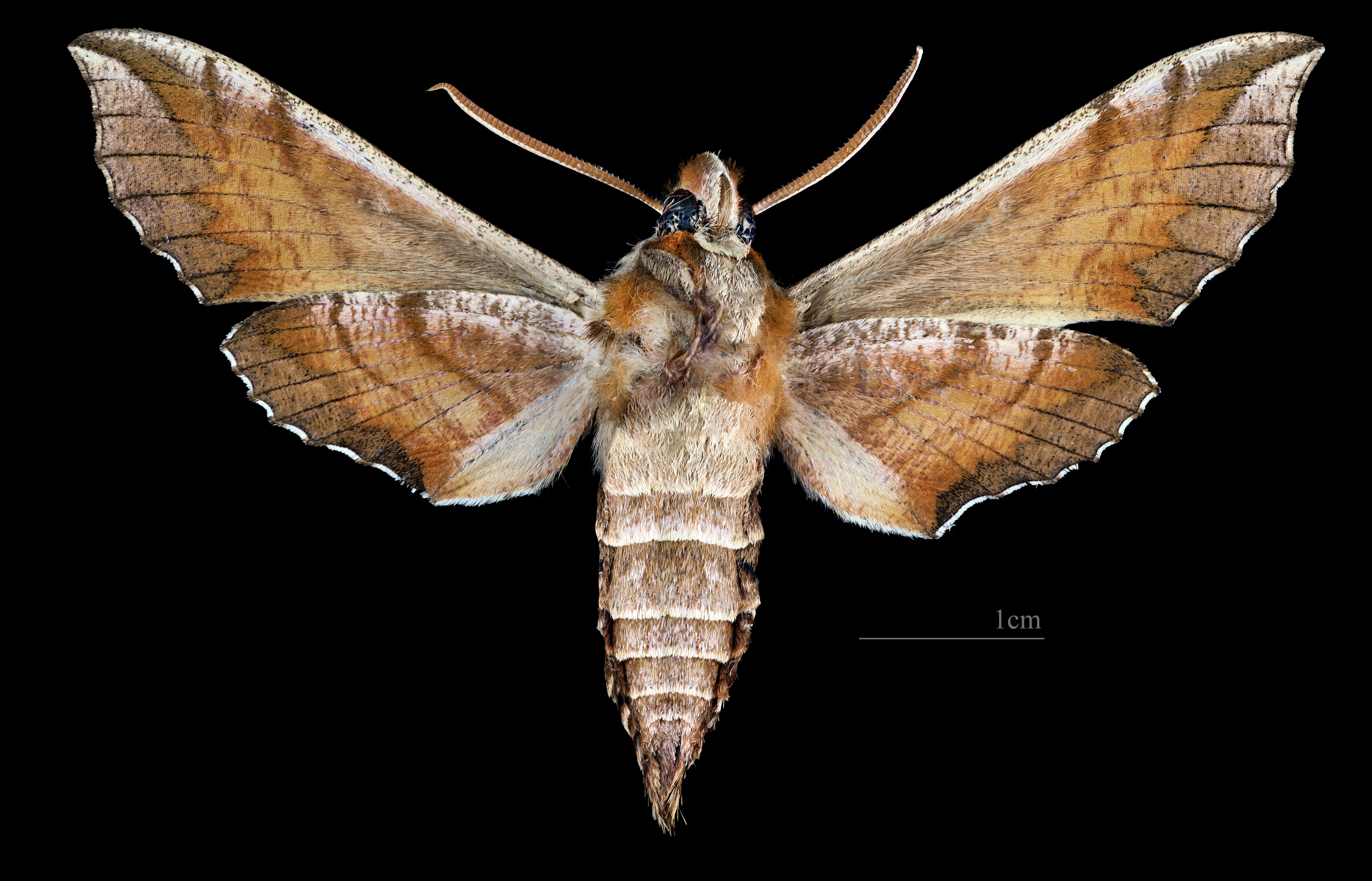
D. askoldensis ♂ △
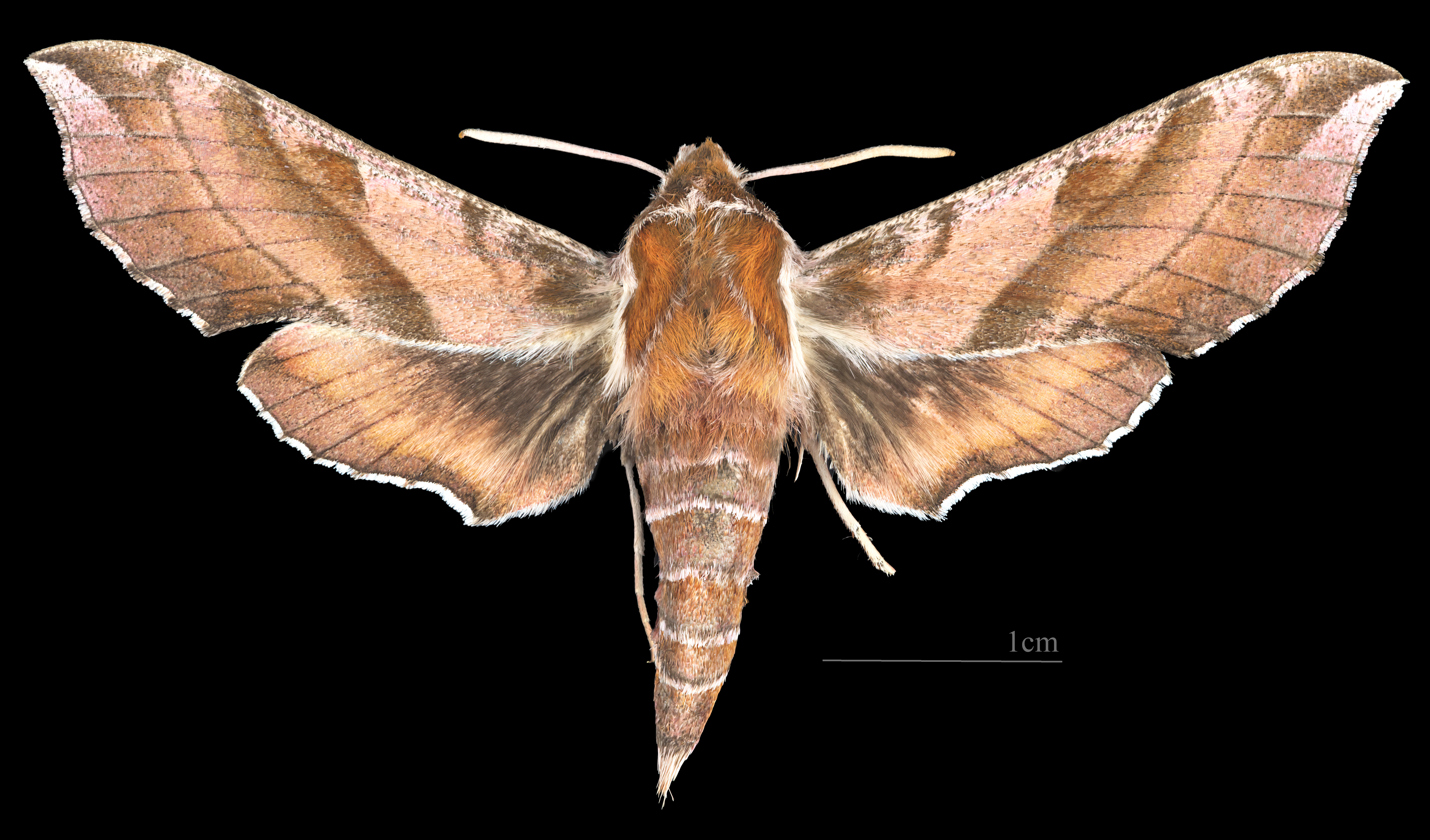
D. askoldensis ♀

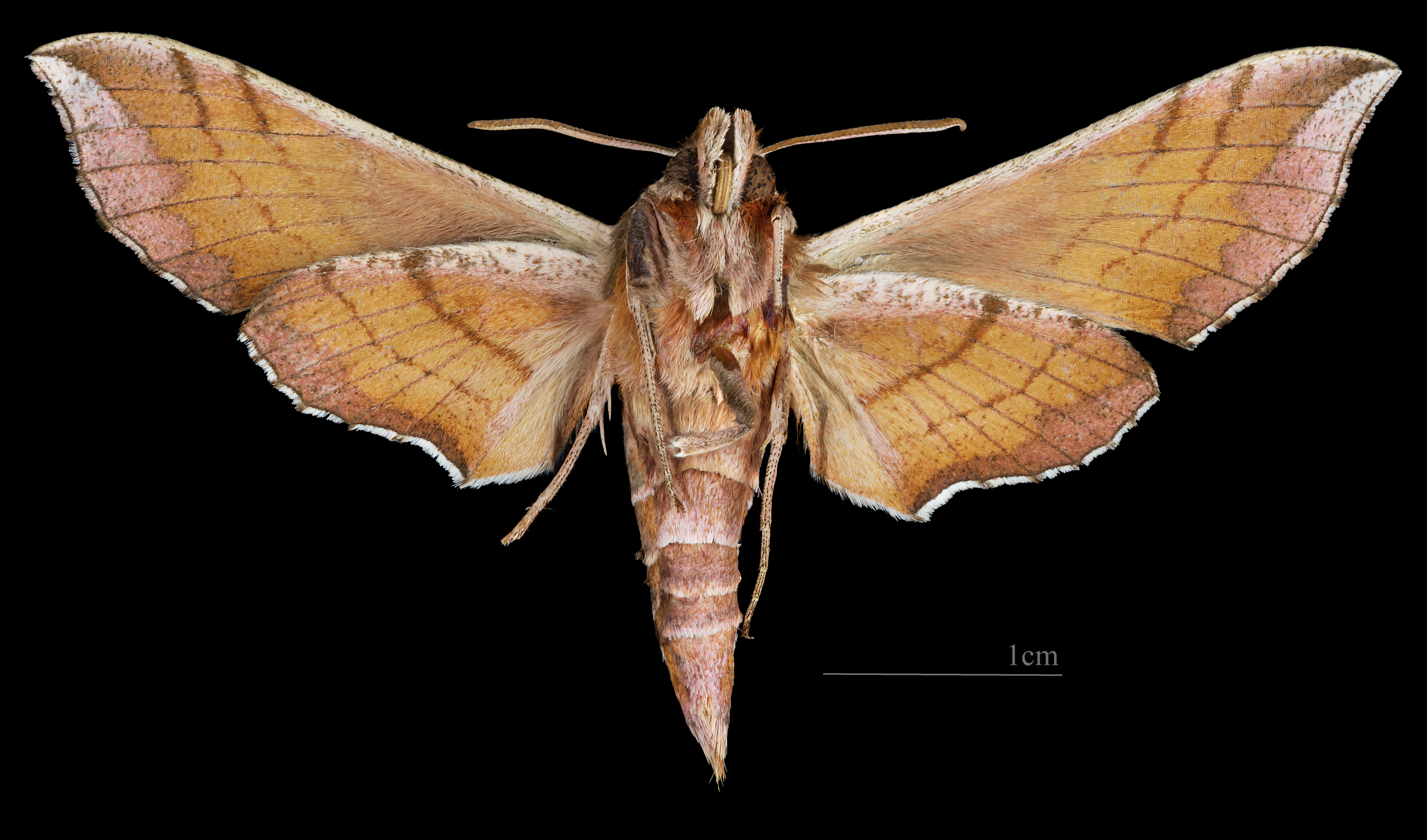
D. askoldensis ♀ △

== Biology ==
Larvae feed on Vitis amurensis in Russia and Epilobium species in Japan.
