= Jakob Heinrich Laspeyres =

German entomologist

Jakob Heinrich Laspeyres (German: [laˈspɛːɐ̯]; 9 April 1769, Berlin – 28 November 1809, Berlin) was a German entomologist especially interested in Lepidoptera. He was a Bürgermeister in Berlin. Laspeyres collection is in Museum für Naturkunde.

The moth genus Laspeyresia is named after him.

== Works ==
- Kritische Revision der neuen Ausgabe des systematischen Verzeichnisses von den Schmetterlingen der Wienergegend. Illigers's Magazine (von Karl Illiger). Braunschweig, Karl Reichard, 1803
- Sesiae Europaeae Iconibus et Descriptionibus illustratae, 32 pp., 1 pl. Berlin. pdf

== Other references ==
- Horn, W. H. R. & Schenkling, S. 1928-1929: Index Litteraturae Entomologicae, Serie I: die Welt-Literatur über die gesamte Entomologie bis inklusive 1863. - Berlin-Dahlem, Selbstverlag W. Horn 1-4 XXI p., 1426 p., 4 Tafeln
