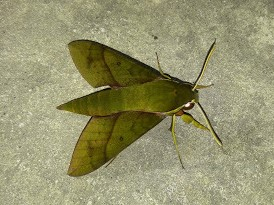

Scientific classification
- Kingdom: Animalia
- Phylum: Arthropoda
- Class: Insecta
- Order: Lepidoptera
- Family: Sphingidae
- Genus: Gnathothlibus
- Species: G. fijiensis

Binomial name
- Gnathothlibus fijiensis Lachlan, 2009

= Gnathothlibus fijiensis =

Species of moth

Gnathothlibus fijiensis is a species of moth in the family Sphingidae. It is known from Fiji.

== Description ==
The length of the forewings is 38–41 mm for males and 40-44 for females. It is similar to Gnathothlibus eras, Gnathothlibus saccoi and Gnathothlibus vanuatuensis.
