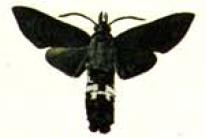

Scientific classification
- Domain: Eukaryota
- Kingdom: Animalia
- Phylum: Arthropoda
- Class: Insecta
- Order: Lepidoptera
- Family: Sphingidae
- Genus: Leucostrophus
- Species: L. alterhirundo

Binomial name
- Leucostrophus alterhirundo d'Abrera, 1871

Synonyms
- Macroglossa hirundo Gerstaecker, 1871

= Leucostrophus alterhirundo =

Species of moth

Leucostrophus alterhirundo is a moth of the family Sphingidae. It is found from Ethiopia and Somalia, south to Zambia and Malawi.

The wingspan is 39–48 mm. The abdomen upperside has a pale belt on tergites four and five. It is chalky white, without a bluish tint unless scales have been rubbed off. The abdomen underside has a gradually fading white colour, so the posterior half is clayish rather than black. Both wings are of a paler slate colour than Leucostrophus commasiae.

The larvae feed on Strychnos species.
