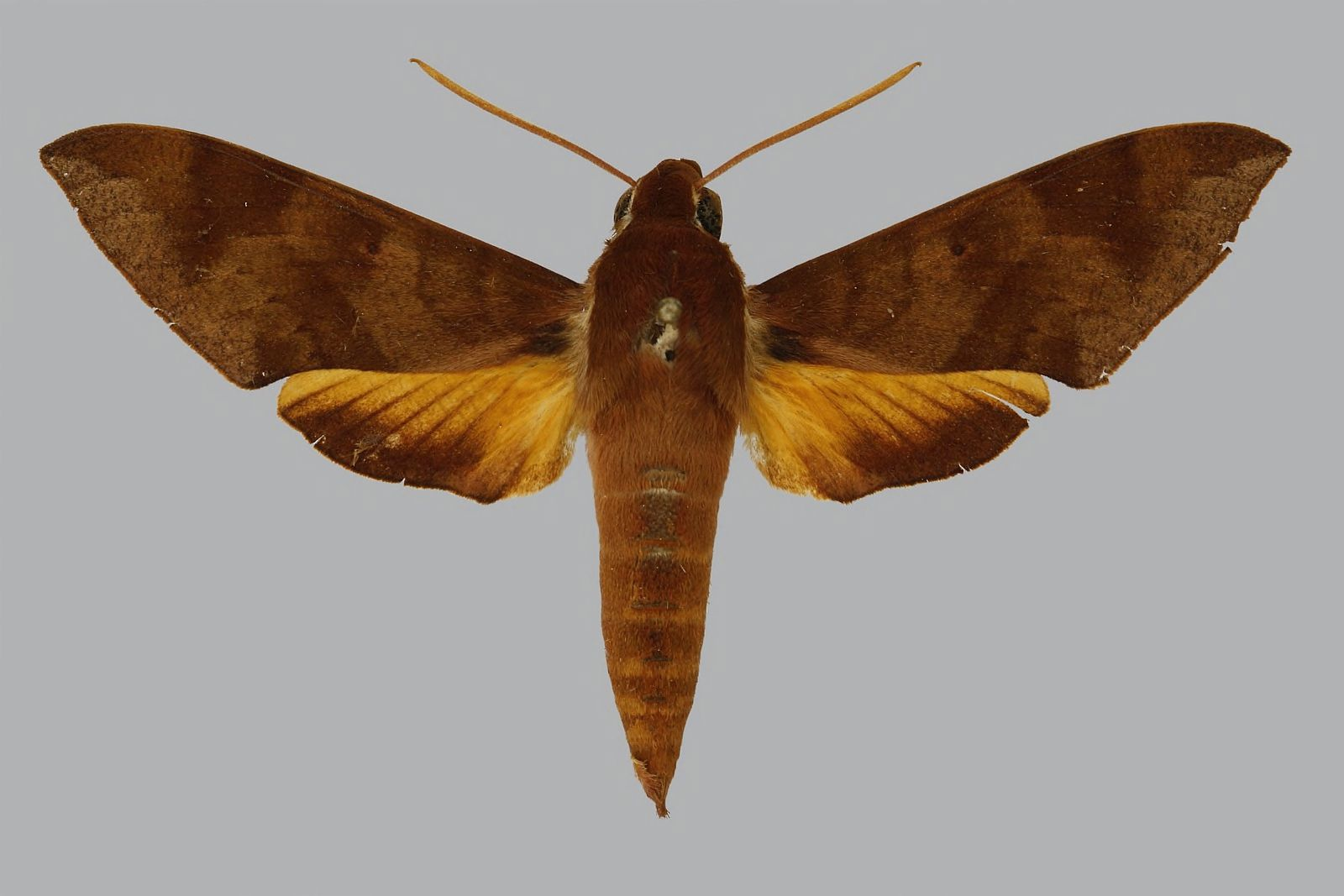

Scientific classification
- Domain: Eukaryota
- Kingdom: Animalia
- Phylum: Arthropoda
- Class: Insecta
- Order: Lepidoptera
- Family: Sphingidae
- Genus: Gnathothlibus
- Species: G. collardi

Binomial name
- Gnathothlibus collardi Haxaire, 2002

= Gnathothlibus collardi =

Species of moth

Gnathothlibus collardi is a moth of the family Sphingidae. It is a hybrid between a female Philodila astyanor and a male Gnathothlibus eras. It is known from Tahiti.

The length of the forewings is about 35 millimetres (1.4 in).

== Taxonomy ==
Gnathothlibus collardi was described as a species, but by combining barcodes, morphology and a nuclear marker, research has shown that it is actually an F1 hybrid between two closely related species.
