= Poverty Inc (disambiguation) =

Poverty Inc. may refer to

- Poverty, Inc., a 2014 film by Michael Matheson Miller
- Poverty Inc. (Gary Null film), a 2014 film by Gary Null
- A fall 1993 issue of Southern Exposure magazine
