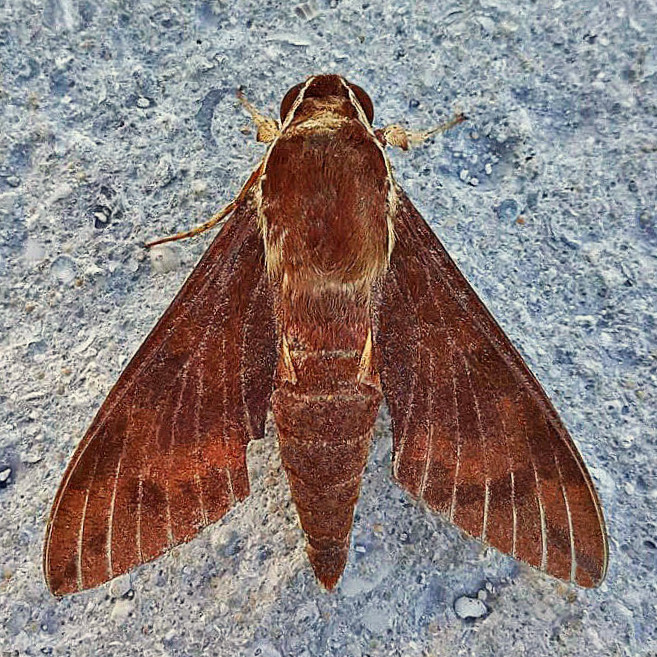

Scientific classification
- Kingdom: Animalia
- Phylum: Arthropoda
- Class: Insecta
- Order: Lepidoptera
- Family: Sphingidae
- Genus: Gnathothlibus
- Species: G. erotus

Binomial name
- Gnathothlibus erotus (Cramer, 1777)

Synonyms
- List: Sphinx erotus Cramer, 1777; Choercampa andamanensis Kirby, 1877; Chromis eras Boisduval, 1832; Chromis cramptoni Clark, 1922

= Gnathothlibus erotus =

White-brow hawkmoth

Species of moth

Gnathothlibus erotus, the white-brow hawkmoth, is a moth of the family Sphingidae. The species was first described by Pieter Cramer in 1777.

== Taxonomic notes ==
- Gnathothlibus erotus (Oriental tropics)
- Gnathothlibus erotus eras (from the Moluccas eastwards) transferred to Gnathothlibus eras

== Distribution ==
This species can be found from India to Borneo and from Australia and Cook Islands to New Caledonia and eastwards into Polynesia as far as Pitcairn Island.

== Description ==
Larvae have been recorded on a wide range of plants, including Ipomoea batatas, Vitis vinifera, Dillenia alata, Escallonia macrantha, Melastoma affine, Pentas lanceolata, Cayratia acris, Cayratia clematidea, Cayratia trifolia, Leea indica, Parthenocissus quinquefolia, Hibbertia scandens, Cissus and Morinda.

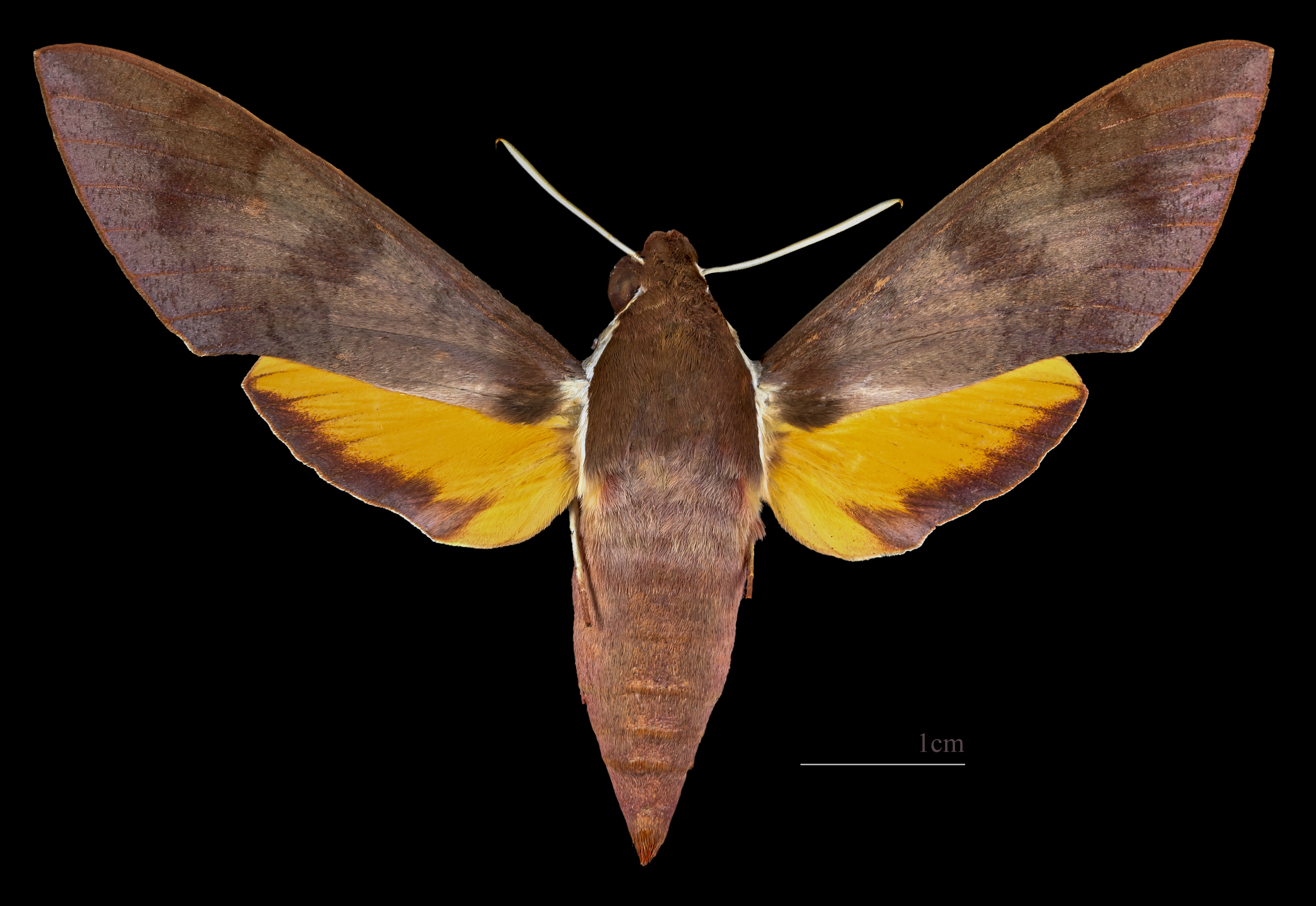
Gnathothlibus erotus ♂

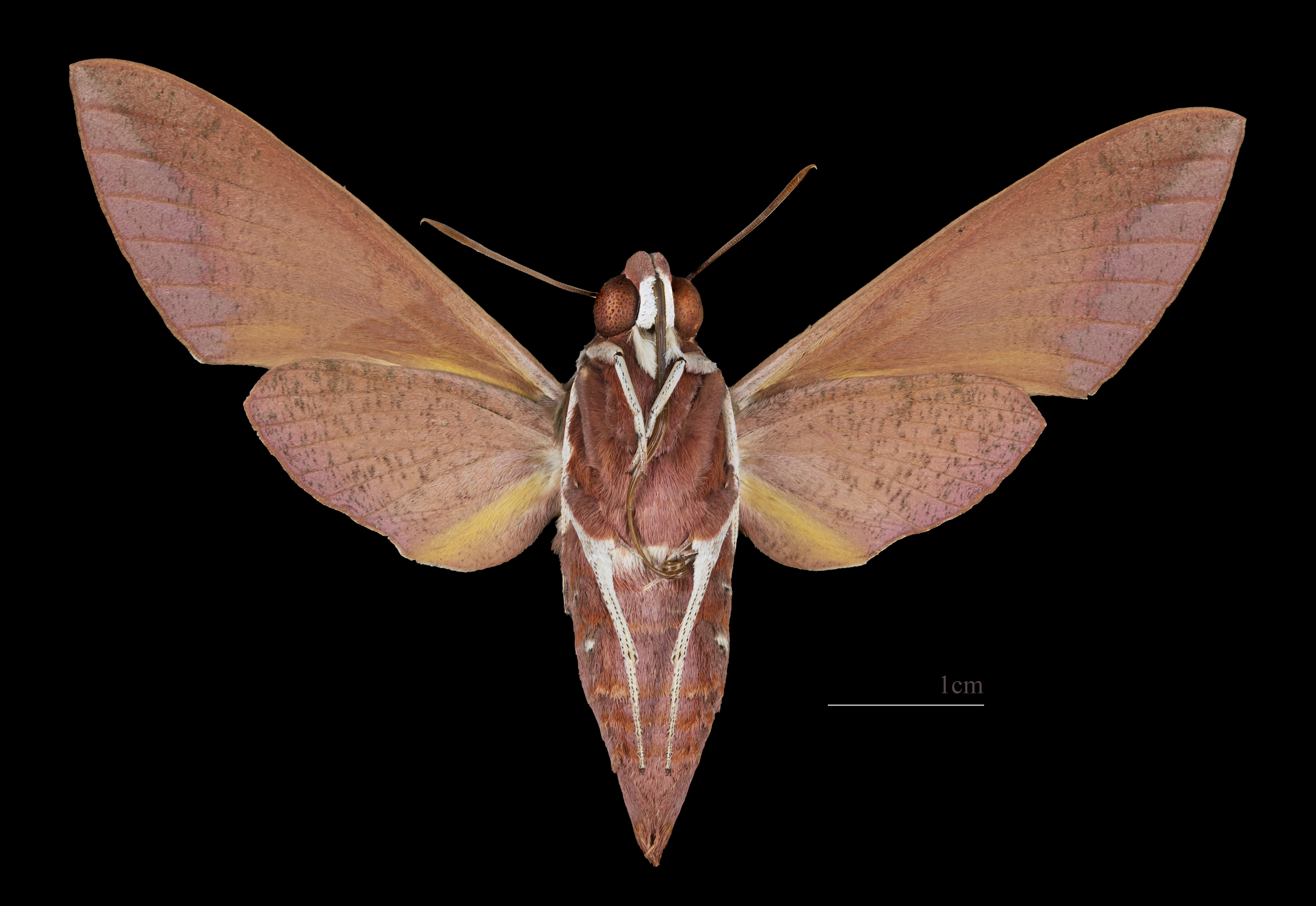
Gnathothlibus erotus ♂ △
