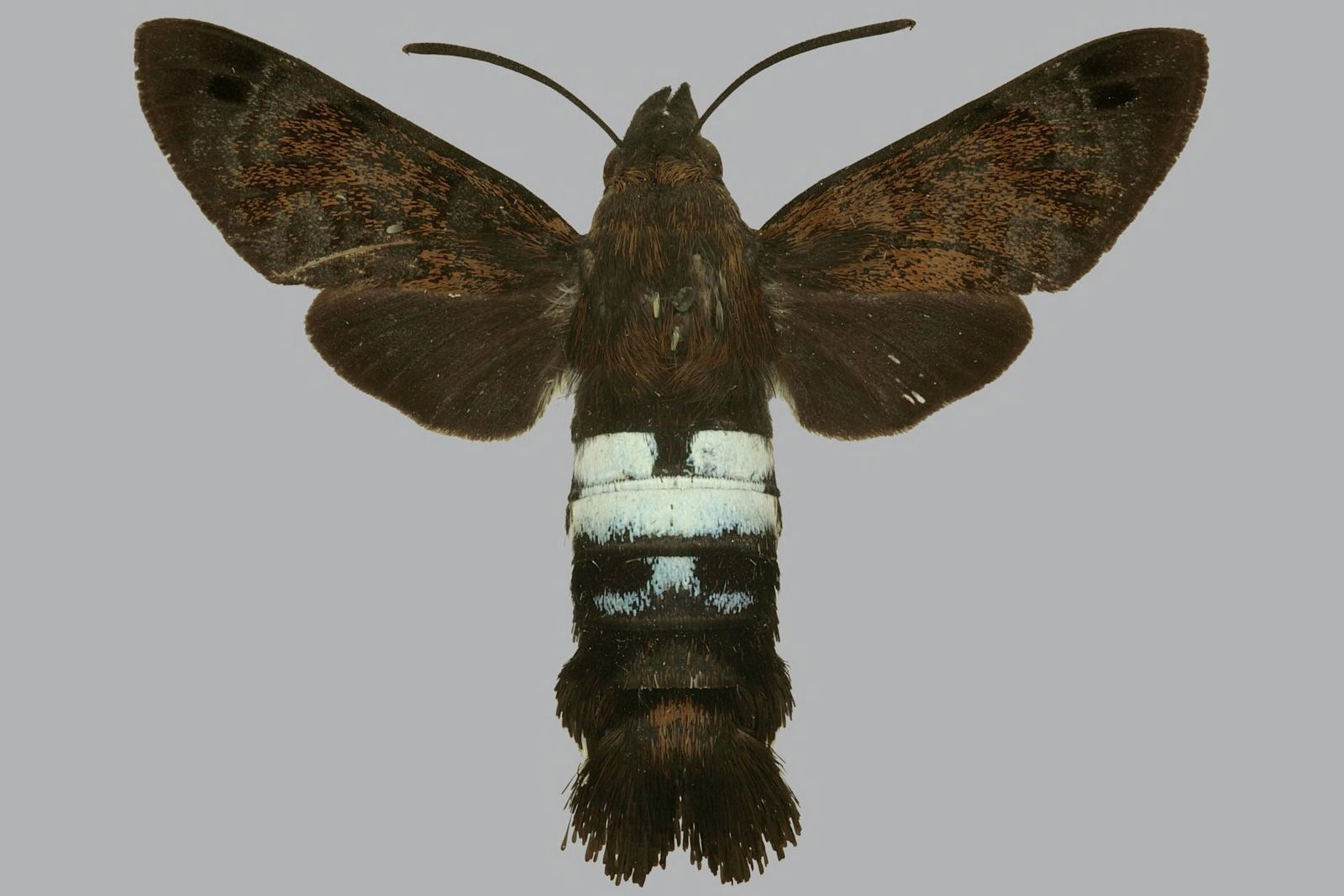
- Adult female L. commasiae from Sierra Leone

Scientific classification
- Domain: Eukaryota
- Kingdom: Animalia
- Phylum: Arthropoda
- Class: Insecta
- Order: Lepidoptera
- Family: Sphingidae
- Subtribe: Macroglossina
- Genus: Leucostrophus; Rothschild & Jordan, 1903

Type species
- Macroglossa commasiae Walker, 1856

Species
- 2, see text

= Leucostrophus =

Genus of moths

Leucostrophus is a genus of moths in the family Sphingidae. They are large, diurnal moths native to Africa.

== Species ==
This genus contains the following species:

- Leucostrophus alterhirundo d'Abrera, 1987
- Leucostrophus commasiae (Walker, 1856)
