= Buzz-a-Rama =

Coordinates: 40.6425°N 73.9808°W

Buzz-a-Rama was a slot car racing venue which operated in the Kensington neighborhood of Brooklyn, New York from 1965 to 2021.

Slot car racing is a hobby in which enthusiasts work on small, remote controlled cars, and race them at high speeds. Buzz Perri opened Buzz-a-Rama in the Kensington neighborhood of Brooklyn in 1965. Born Frank Perri, he got the nickname "Buzz" while a high-jumper in high school. The hobby was popular in the 1960s, and according to Perri, when it opened there were dozens of similar raceways in the city. Interest faded over time, and Buzz-a-Rama was the last one open, operated by Buzz and his wife, Delores, for more than 55 years.

According to Susan Dominus in a 2009 The New York Times article, hundreds of people once filled the venue when there was a race, but "Buzz-a-Rama represents a microcosm of the United States auto industry itself: beloved, historic, and long past the glory days". The space had multiple electrified race tracks and some older arcade games, and it sold parts for the cars. Business slowed over time, and eventually was only open on weekends and some holidays. Perri told the Times that the business did not make money, and if he did not own the building it was in, it would not have been able to operate.

Buzz and Delores Perri operated the space at 69 Church Avenue from 1965 until May 2021, when they both died of COVID-19. The Daily Beast featured a story titled "The Totally Preventable Death of a Brooklyn Icon", about Dolores' relationship with Gary Null, an American talk radio host and author who rejects the scientific consensus on a wide range of topics, including vaccines, and advocates pseudoscientific alternative medicine. Like Null, she believed vaccines to be toxic and neither she nor Buzz would get a COVID-19 vaccine.

Their son, Frank, took ownership of the space, but said it did not make financial sense to continue to operate, so put its inventory up for auction in January 2022.
