= Gnathothlibus samoaensis =

Scientific classification
- Kingdom: Animalia
- Phylum: Arthropoda
- Class: Insecta
- Order: Lepidoptera
- Family: Sphingidae
- Genus: Gnathothlibus
- Species: G. samoaensis

Binomial name
- Gnathothlibus samoaensis Lachlan, 2009

Species of moth

Gnathothlibus samoaensis is a moth of the family Sphingidae. It is known from Samoa.

The length of the forewings is 35.4–44.3 mm for males and 43.6–44.7 for females.
