= D'Abrera's tiger =

Conservation status
- Vulnerable (IUCN 2.3)

Scientific classification
- Kingdom: Animalia
- Phylum: Arthropoda
- Clade: Pancrustacea
- Class: Insecta
- Order: Lepidoptera
- Family: Nymphalidae
- Genus: Parantica
- Species: P. dabrerai

Binomial name
- Parantica dabrerai (Miller & Miller, 1978)

Species of butterfly

The D'Abrera's tiger (Parantica dabrerai) is a species of nymphalid butterfly in the Danainae subfamily. It is endemic to Sulawesi, Indonesia. The species was discovered by Bernard d'Abrera, an Australian entomological taxonomist. The butterfly is described as black and white, with similar markings to a monarch butterfly.
