= Gnathothlibus australiensis =

Scientific classification
- Kingdom: Animalia
- Phylum: Arthropoda
- Class: Insecta
- Order: Lepidoptera
- Family: Sphingidae
- Genus: Gnathothlibus
- Species: G. australiensis

Binomial name
- Gnathothlibus australiensis Lachlan, 2004

Species of moth

Gnathothlibus australiensis is a moth of the family Sphingidae. It is known from the Northern Territory and Queensland.

The length of the forewings is 33–38 mm.
