= Philodila =

Scientific classification
- Domain: Eukaryota
- Kingdom: Animalia
- Phylum: Arthropoda
- Class: Insecta
- Order: Lepidoptera
- Family: Sphingidae
- Subtribe: Macroglossina
- Genus: Philodila; Rothschild & Jordan, 1903
- Species: P. astyanor

Binomial name
- Philodila astyanor (Boisduval, 1875)

Synonyms
- Everyx astyanor Boisduval, 1875

Genus of moths

Philodila is a genus of moths in the family Sphingidae first described by Walter Rothschild and Karl Jordan in 1903. Its only species, Philodila astyanor, described by Jean Baptiste Boisduval in 1875, is known from the Society Islands in the South Pacific Ocean.

It is similar to Gnathothlibus species, but distinguishable by the lack of any yellow or orange on the hindwing upperside. The antennae are very long, extending beyond the discal spot. The forewing apex is produced and the outer margin is obtusely angulate. The forewing upperside ground colour is brown. The antemedian band is slightly and evenly curved, the edges darker brown, medially with a slight purplish tone and situated just basal of the small dark discal spot. The apex has a brown triangular mark. The marginal band has an irregular proximal edge. The hindwing upperside is reddish-brown with a greyish marginal band.
