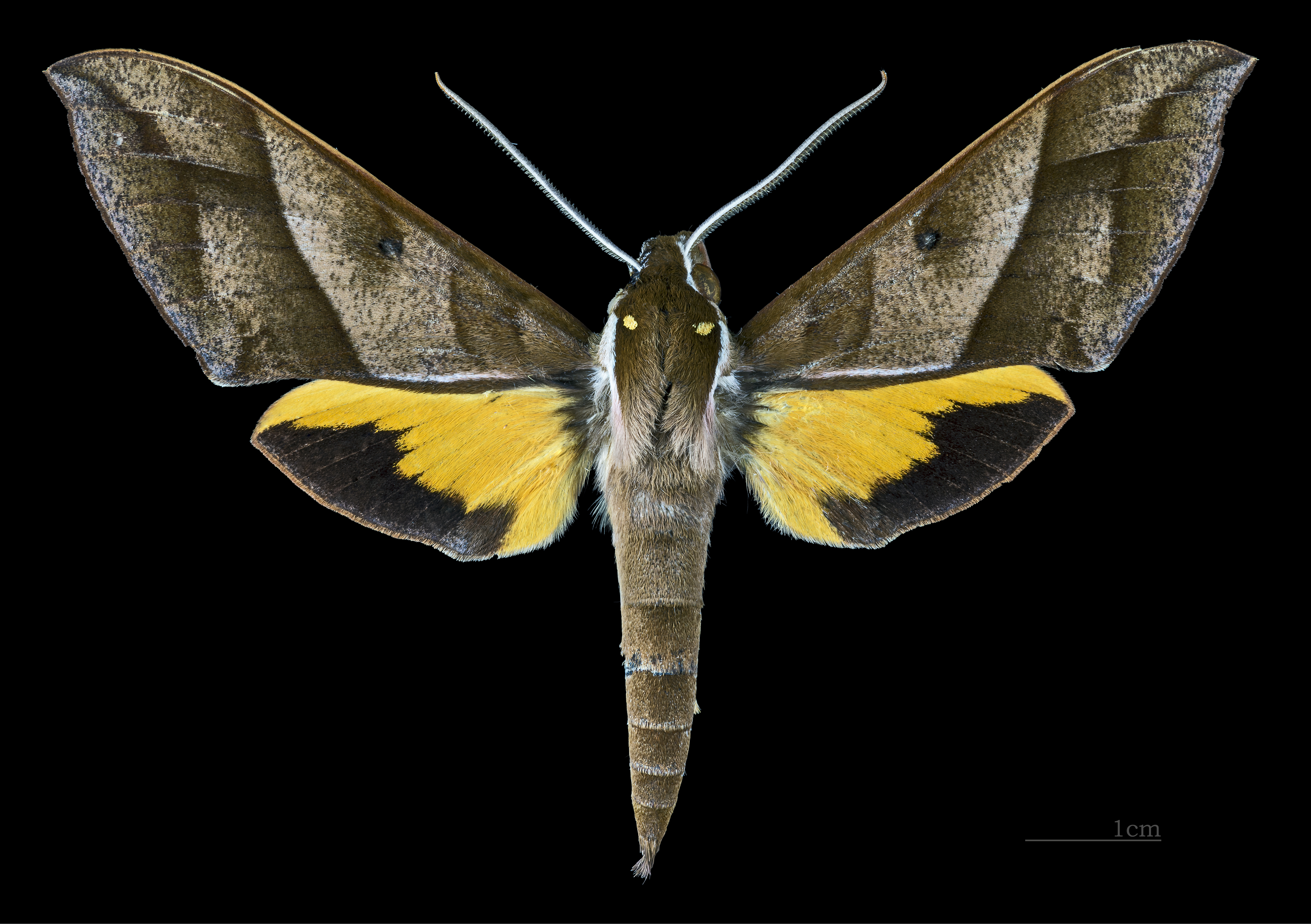
- Gnathothlibus meeki male dorsal MHNT
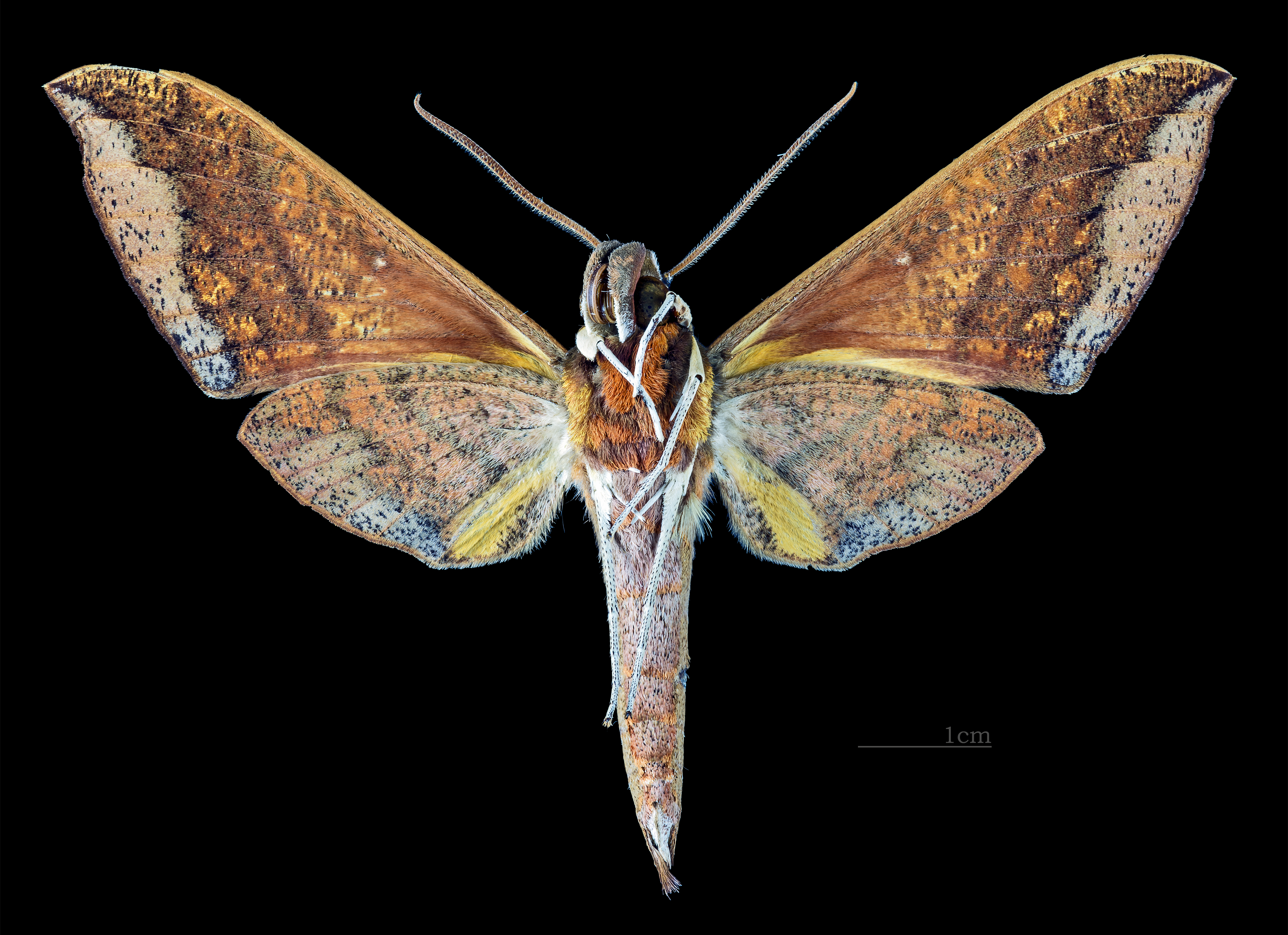
- Gnathothlibus meeki male ventral MHNT

Scientific classification
- Kingdom: Animalia
- Phylum: Arthropoda
- Class: Insecta
- Order: Lepidoptera
- Family: Sphingidae
- Genus: Gnathothlibus
- Species: G. meeki

Binomial name
- Gnathothlibus meeki (Rothschild & Jordan, 1907)

Synonyms
- Chromis meeki Rothschild & Jordan, 1907

= Gnathothlibus meeki =

Species of moth

Gnathothlibus meeki is a moth of the family Sphingidae. It is known from Papua New Guinea. It prefers mountainous areas.

The species name honours Albert Stewart Meek.
