= Bernard d'Abrera =

Australian entomologist (1940–2017)

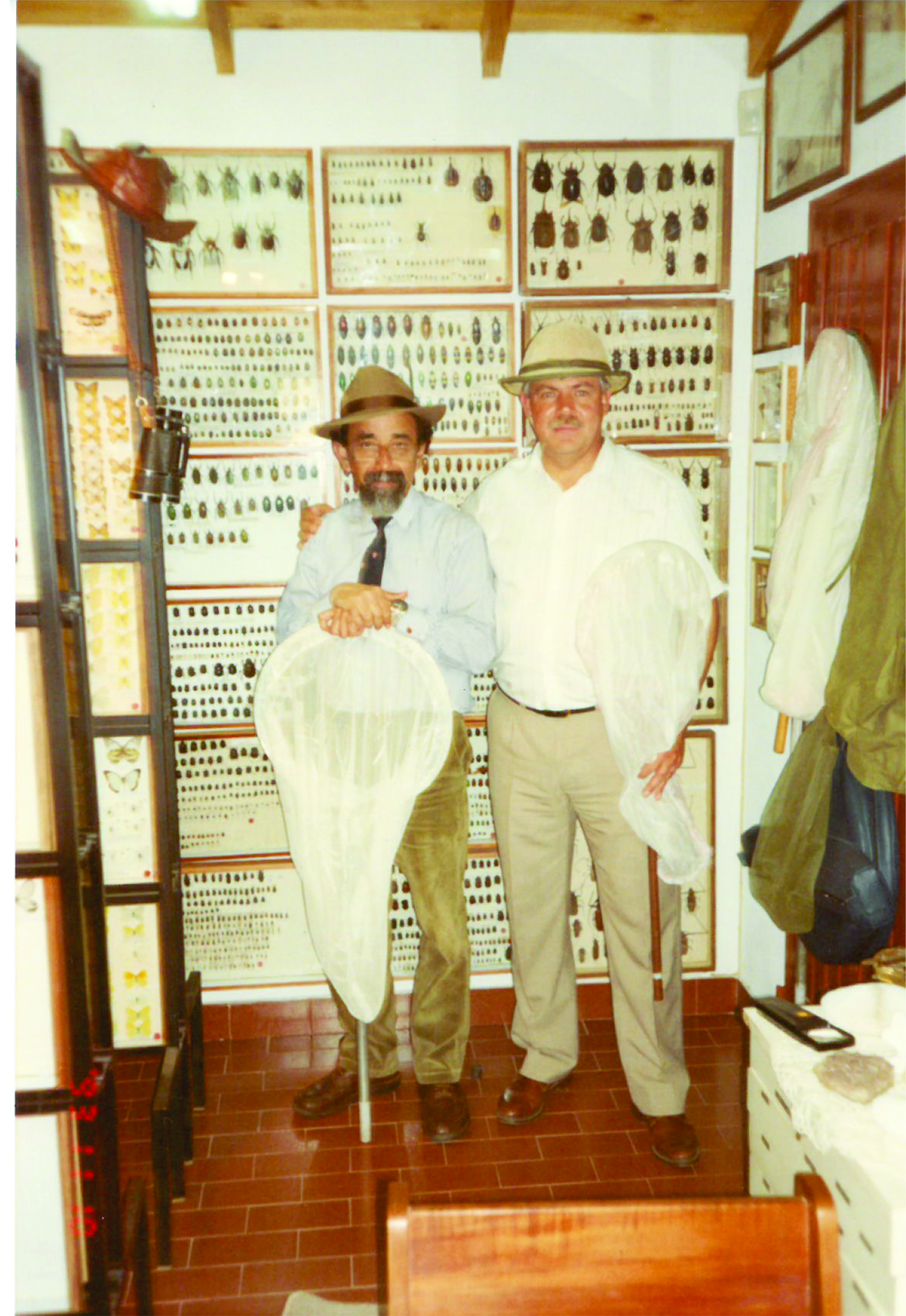
Bernard d'Abrera (left)

Bernard d'Abrera (28 August 1940 – 13 January 2017) was an Australian entomological taxonomist and philosopher of science, particularly noted for his books on true butterflies (Papilionoidea) and larger moths of the world (Saturniidae and Sphingidae). Referred to as one of the world's best-known lepidopterists by The Daily Telegraph, his work since 1982 was openly critical of evolution.

== Biography ==
Bernard d'Abrera was a graduate of the University of New South Wales in Sydney, Australia. While at the university in 1964 he with a group of other students kidnapped an alligator from Taronga Zoo as a Foundation Day prank. Using 80 biology students as a shield, the group captured the animal in a bag and walked out through the turnstiles. The animal was returned after payment of a £100 ransom, which went towards establishing the first aboriginal scholarship of the University of New South Wales.

He received his Bachelor of Arts in 1965, with a double major in History & Philosophy of Science and History. He has a diploma in Education (Melbourne T.C., 1972).

D'Abrera spent over forty years photographing museum specimens of butterflies and moths, as well as identifying and cataloguing specimens around the world. He has also visited the Macleay Museum in Sydney. He contributed his butterfly and moth photographs to other books not authored by him.

The D'Abrera's tiger, Parantica dabrerai, an Indonesian butterfly species is named for him, as is Gnathothlibus dabrera, a species of Indonesian moth.

In 1978, d'Abrera helped uncover a smuggling ring on Papua New Guinea estimated to have earned at least $200,000 annually through the rare butterfly black market.

In 1982, d'Abrera and his wife Lucilla founded Hill House Publishers, a publishing house based in Melbourne and London, to publish among other things, his own work. In 1987, Hill House began a project to produce antiquarian facsimiles of the works of Victorian ornithologist John Gould, based on the Natural History Museum's collection. Hill House also publishes authentic facsimiles of documents, prints, and antiquarian maps, including an atlas of the Dutch Indies for the Royal Dutch Geographical Society (KNAG – Gemilang, Landsmeer, 1990). In a 2002 review of the book The Last Sorcerer: Echoes of the Rainforest, Townsend Letter quoted from d'Abrera's 1984 book Butterflies of South America, writing: "The greatest number and diversity of insect and plant species occur in the Neotropics, a vast amount of which is still being discovered and described. Paradoxically, an almost equal amount of unknown creatures is being destroyed even before their discovery, because of the violent and ruthless destruction by civilized man of the complex miracles that make up the Neotropical ecosystem. History alone will pour out its wrathful judgement on these disgraceful goings-on, because contemporary man is too besotted with economic trivia to comprehend the consequences of his avaricious deeds. – Bernard D'Abrera Butterflies of South America (1984)."

== Evolution ==
D'Abrera is listed as a signatory on the petition known as "A Scientific Dissent from Darwinism", a campaign begun in 2001 by the Discovery Institute. D'Abrera is also a fellow of the pro-intelligent design organization, International Society for Complexity, Information and Design.

D'Abrera was strongly opposed to the theory of evolution because in his view it is not a bona fide scientific theory. He describes evolution theory as "viscid, asphyxiating baggage" that requires "blind religious faith", He believed it cannot be tested or demonstrated in any natural frame of reference, and therefore it may not be considered even a scientific postulate. The objection that evolution is unfalsifiable has been widely rejected by the scientific community. D'Abrera's views on evolution and science have been criticised by Arthur Shapiro, who describes him as "profoundly anti-scientific – not unscientific, but hostile to science."
