= Gary Null =

American talk radio host and author who advocates for alternative medicine

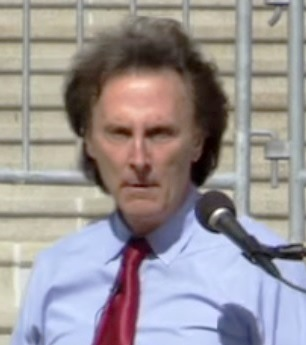
- Null speaking against mandatory vaccinations in 2009
- Born: Parkersburg, West Virginia, U.S.
- Education: Thomas Edison State University
- Occupations: Talk radio host; Nutritionist; Author
- Known for: Production, promotion, and advocacy of pseudoscientific alternative medicine and medical quackery
- Notable work: The Gary Null Show

Gary Michael Null is an American talk radio host and author who advocates pseudoscientific alternative medicine and produces a line of questionable dietary supplements.

Null is hostile to evidence-based medicine and has accused the medical community of being in a cabal with the pharmaceutical industry to suppress novel treatments for economic gains. He has promoted a range of pseudo-scientific and ineffective alternative treatments, including ones for cancer.

He is an HIV/AIDS denialist who believes nutritional deficiencies are the causative agents of all illnesses, and has accordingly promoted fringe, diet-based treatment regimes for curing AIDS and other illnesses. Null holds strong anti-vaccination views and rejects the scientific consensus on topics such as water fluoridation, genetically modified organisms, and electromagnetic fields.

Reactions in the scholarly community to Null's claims have been generally negative, and Null along with his publications have been frequently criticized for disseminating misleading information that can negatively affect the public's understanding of health issues.

== Biography ==
=== Education ===
Null holds an associate degree in business administration from the two-year, for-profit Mountain State College in Parkersburg, West Virginia, and a bachelor's degree from Thomas Edison State College in human nutrition. He says he became interested in nutrition shortly after that while he was working as a part-time cook in New York City. He later enrolled in a Ph.D. program in human nutrition and public health sciences from Union Institute & University, a private distance-learning college headquartered in Cincinnati, Ohio. Null's doctoral thesis was entitled "A Study of Psychological and Physiological Effects of Caffeine on Human Health"; the degree was conferred in July 1989 when he was 44 years old.

Null's academic credentials were investigated by Stephen Barrett, who expressed sharp skepticism about their quality and the quality of his PhD thesis. At the time of Null's education, Edison State College was a non-traditional institute that had no campus and conferred degrees via an external degree program, and towards which administrators evaluated "college-level learning achieved through work or life experiences, self-study, college courses taken previously, industry-sponsored education programs, military instruction" and other prior learning. Similarly, the rules for obtaining a PhD at Union Institute & University were a lot less rigid than typical academic practice, and allowed students to design their own course curriculum, form their doctoral committee, and attend only a few seminars; 13 years later, it would be subject to sanctions for failing to meet academic standards. Barrett said that the core member of the committee had no relevant subject expertise, having been chosen from the field of geology, and the other members (barring the peers) had contributed to Null's books or promoted alternative health supplements. Kurt Butler's 1992 book Consumer's Guide to Alternative Medicine raised similar questions and also reported that Null had long dodged queries about providing any relevant information (including precise time-spans) for his degrees.

=== Career ===
Null is hostile to many facets of mainstream medicine, arguing that physicians and pharmaceutical companies have an economic interest in promoting rather than preventing sickness, and he has regularly asserted that all diseases are caused by nutritional deficiencies which can be cured by nutritional supplements. In place of standard medical therapy, Null advocated alternative cancer treatments such as Krebiozen, laetrile and Gerson therapy, asserting that "the alternatives have been covered up by those science writers of the national news media who ride shotgun for the medical establishment's solid-gold cancer train". Null has also advocated for the long-debunked Revici's chemotherapy in one of his radio-shows.

Over the years, Null has owned multiple business ventures attempting to sell nutritional supplements for a wide range of diseases and disorders, along with a natural gourmet restaurant, a wellness retreat and an organic farm.

In 1979–80, he co-authored a series of articles on cancer research for Penthouse, entitled "The Politics of Cancer", beginning with "The Great Cancer Fraud", which opened: "America's cancer plague has made the medical establishment and its media collaborators rich-even as they suppress new cancer cures". They provided early coverage of the Burzynski Clinic, a controversial clinic that offered an unproven cancer treatment, helping to bring it to public prominence, alleged that mainstream physicians advocate treatments that killed patients sooner than cancer itself and that conventional therapies amplified the disease. In 1985, Null began writing a lengthy series of reports for Penthouse titled "Medical Genocide" that asserted mainstream medicine was completely ineffective in curing a range of major ailments from cardiac diseases to arthritis. The series also promoted a range of nutrition regimens and alternative treatments for cancer including but not limited to laetrile, krebiozen, intermittent fasting and Gerson therapy as first-line therapy. James Harvey Young described Null as a "zealous journalist of unorthodoxy", in the regard.

Null is also an HIV/AIDS denialist and asserts the existence of government conspiracies to suppress effective diet-based treatments for AIDS. As of 1999, his position was reported to be that the role that HIV played in AIDS was not as great as scientists generally believed, a discredited theory. By 2013, however, Null was writing on his blog that "HIV equals AIDS" was a "myth". His book AIDS: A Second Opinion advocated for a range of dietary supplements for HIV-positive individuals instead of antiretroviral medication. Null also produced a variety of audio-visual media featuring other denialists, who spread misinformation about HIV tests and even alleged anti-retroviral therapy to be the causative agent of AIDS; the OPV AIDS hypothesis was propounded for the first time over one of his radio-shows, by a fellow foot-soldier. Some of Null's productions portrayed those patients as the real heroes, who rejected anti-retroviral therapy in favor of his nutrition-based regimen. Null's articles (and alternative treatment regimens) have been featured over the website of Peter Duesberg.

In 1999, Time magazine wrote of Null: "From a young reporter this is to be expected. But two decades later, Null, 54, is still warning of a variety of medical bogeymen out to gull a trusting public"; other sources have reported Null's view that HIV does not cause AIDS. Salon described his work as "massive, irresponsible and nearly unreadable". AIDS advocacy groups have asked for his works to be censured, as detrimental to public health. Seth Kalichman, professor of social psychology at the University of Connecticut, has decried Null's role as a prominent proponent of AIDS denialism and has accused him of cashing in on HIV/AIDS. In his 2009 book called Denying AIDS, he compared Null's activities to Holocaust denial and described Null as an example of a dangerous entrepreneur who "obviously breached" the balance between free speech and protecting public health. Nicoli Nattrass described Null as a 'cultopreneur'.

In 2010, Null reported that he became ill and had to see his doctor and that six other consumers were hospitalized for vitamin D poisoning after ingesting a nutritional supplement manufactured by his own contractor. In a lawsuit against the company, he alleged that the supplement erroneously contained more than 1,000 times the dose of vitamin D reported on the label. Null received numerous telephone calls from customers while himself in severe pain. The Los Angeles Times wrote that Null's experience "should give pause to anyone lured by the extravagant claims of many supplement makers", and said that it was common for dietary supplements to contain doses "wildly different than those indicated on their label" as a result of weak regulation.

Null had been a keynote speaker at a rally opposing mandatory H1N1 influenza vaccination during the 2009 flu pandemic, leading the New York State Department of Health to hold a simultaneous conference to dismiss Null's claims about the vaccine as "not scientifically credible" by discussing the clinical trials. Null had opposed public vaccination deeming them as unsafe and ineffective treatments; he has also promoted discredited notions of vaccines causing autism and other ailments, including leading to infant death. Discussing Null's anti-vaccination efforts, Harriet Hall deems Null to have a bad track record for scientific credibility.

Jonathan Howard, former director of Neurology department at Bellevue Hospital, stated that Null's book Death by Medicine (wherein he had calculated conventional medicine to be the single-largest cause of death in America), was statistically flawed and ill-intended, with an aim to gain on a potential rift between patients and mainstream physicians.

Null has been also a supporter of touch therapy and magnet therapy, both of which have been long determined to not provide any tangible health benefits. In a product brochure, he falsely claimed of magnets being inserted in space suits to avoid adverse complications in astronauts. He has also promoted homeopathy, vouched for pangamic acid to be Vitamin B15.

Butler referred to Null's very many fringe assertions in the field of nutrition spanning from claims that fatty meats are difficult to digest, that meats do not provide any energy and milk is not a good source of calcium, to the claim Vitamin C increases body requirements for iron and certain nutrients are preferable to be consumed in daytime, while the rest in night-time. Null also recommends coffee enemas and advocates for cranial osteopathy, applied kinesiology and pulsed electromagnetic field therapy. Corby Kummer noted Null's Vegetarian Handbook to contain an outlandish combination of plant foods supposedly high in protein.

Null has produced many works (incl. television programs and books) about reversing aging; he rejects mainstream scholarship deeming the inevitable progression of senescence as normalcy and instead typifies a popular mis-construal about the aging body being an abnormal deviant.

Science-Based Medicine described Null as a consistent opponent of evidence-based medicine. Butler said Null was the foremost promoter of dangerous health-related misinformation to the public and sarcastically remarked that Null is so often wrong, it may be better for an average audience to believe the precise opposite of what he says.

Null has been a popular author and commands a large following. He has been criticised by fellow practitioners of alternative medicine including Andrew Weil, People With AIDS. He has been frequently published over Townsend Letter, a periodical focusing on alternative medicine.

== Media work ==
Null began broadcasting a syndicated radio talk show, Natural Living with Gary Null, in 1980. His show was broadcast first on WBAI, then on the VoiceAmerica Network and over the Internet. Null's show subsequently returned to WBAI, leading to protests from ACT-UP New York and other AIDS activist groups concerned by Null's promotion of AIDS denialism. He continues to host The Gary Null Show through the Progressive Radio Network, which he established in 2005. His shows attracted about a fifth of the total audience-subscriptions to WBAI circa 1994 and he was speculated to have incurred the maximum revenues, in the history of the WBAI station, even during its brief shutdown in October 2019. Butler has written that Null has provided potentially dangerous and outright dubious medical advice to a variety of patient-callers via these fora.

=== PBS ===
Null has made several self-funded and self-produced documentary films on public policy, personal health, and development. These have been aired by PBS during pledge drives, leading to a surge in sales of his books. The use of Null's films in PBS pledge drives has raised ethical concerns for those involved with the network, who felt that Null's claims were pseudo-scientific and that PBS should not promote them. While Null's films were highly effective in generating financial contributions, the president of PBS, Ervin Duggan, expressed concern that such programming "open[ed] the door to quacks and charlatans". Some member stations have refused to broadcast his programs.

Discover magazine's Keith Kloor condemned Null's 2012 documentary film Seeds of Death: Unveiling the Lies of GMOs, writing that the film:

... is a classic collection of all the untruths, myths, and tropes commonly used by the anti-GMO movement. The scope of its dishonesty is brazen... This is crazy train stuff said with a straight face. The worldview that allows someone to believe such things cannot be penetrated with legitimate scientific information.

=== Film ===
Null has written, directed and self-produced dozens of documentary-style films. Poverty Inc was released in 2014 to poor reviews from critics. Other films include Autism: Made in the U.S.A. (2009) and Gulf War Syndrome: Killing Our Own (2007).
