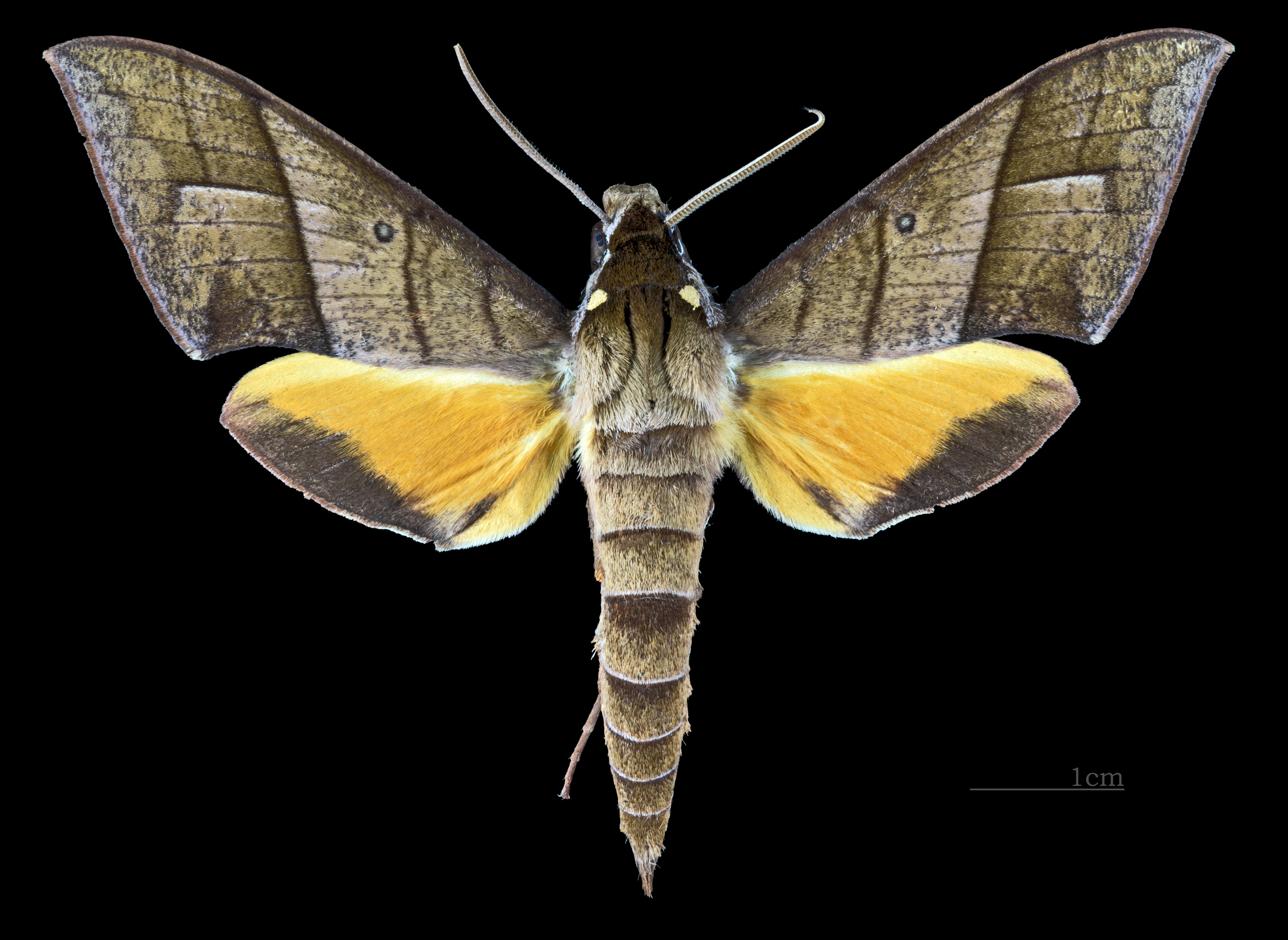
- Gnathothlibus heliodes dorsal Male MHNT
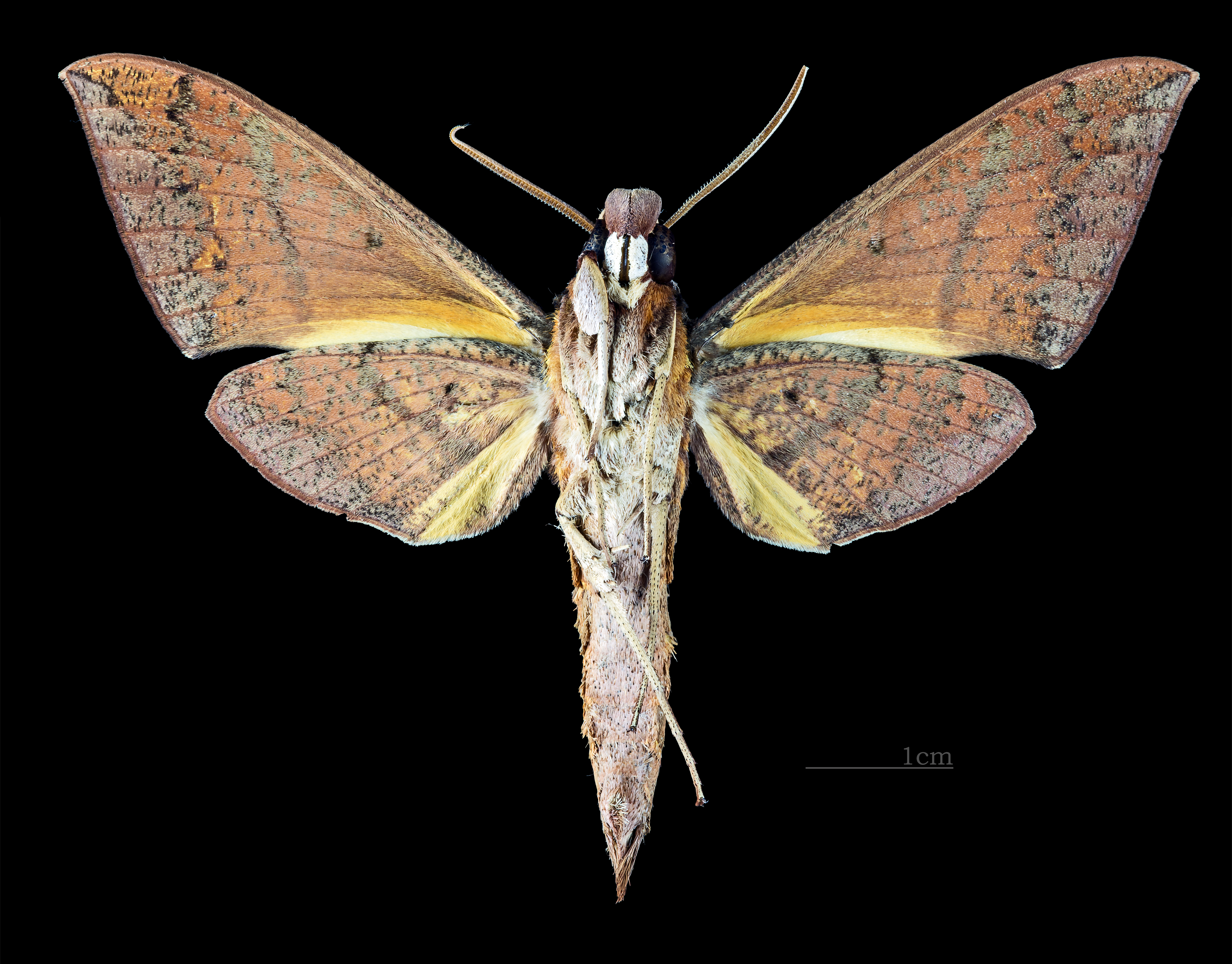
- Gnathothlibus heliodes ventral Male MHNT

Scientific classification
- Kingdom: Animalia
- Phylum: Arthropoda
- Class: Insecta
- Order: Lepidoptera
- Family: Sphingidae
- Genus: Gnathothlibus
- Species: G. heliodes

Binomial name
- Gnathothlibus heliodes (Meyrick, 1889)

Synonyms
- Deilephila heliodes Meyrick, 1889; Theretra alberti Rothschild, 1895

= Gnathothlibus heliodes =

Species of moth

Gnathothlibus heliodes is a moth of the family Sphingidae. It is known from Papua New Guinea and some adjacent islands.

The outer margin of the forewing is straight or very slightly convex. The forewing upperside ground colour is light brown with a straight brown postmedian line, two slightly convex basal lines and two indistinct crenulated antemedian lines.
