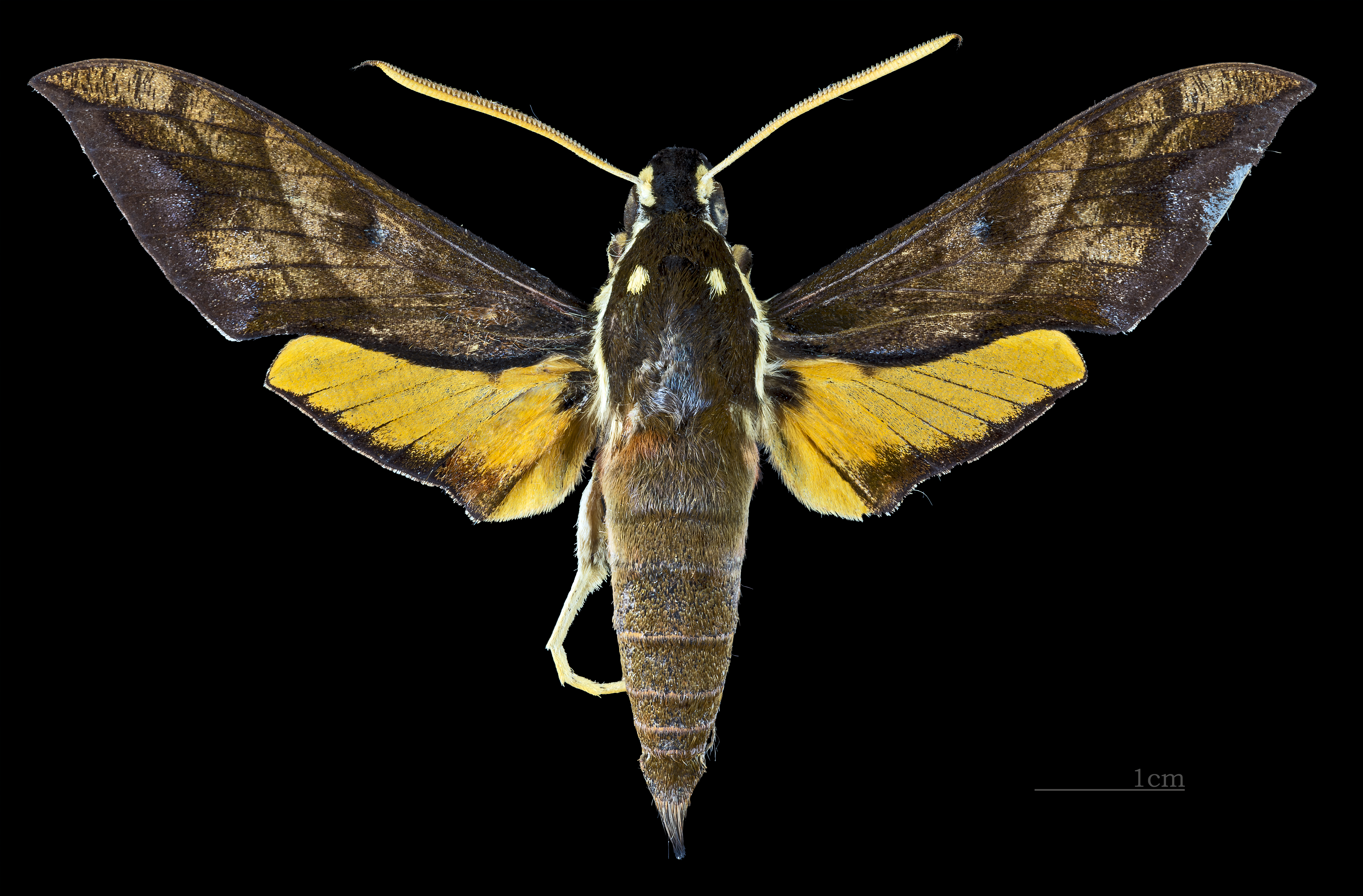
- Gnathothlibus brendelli dorsal MHNT
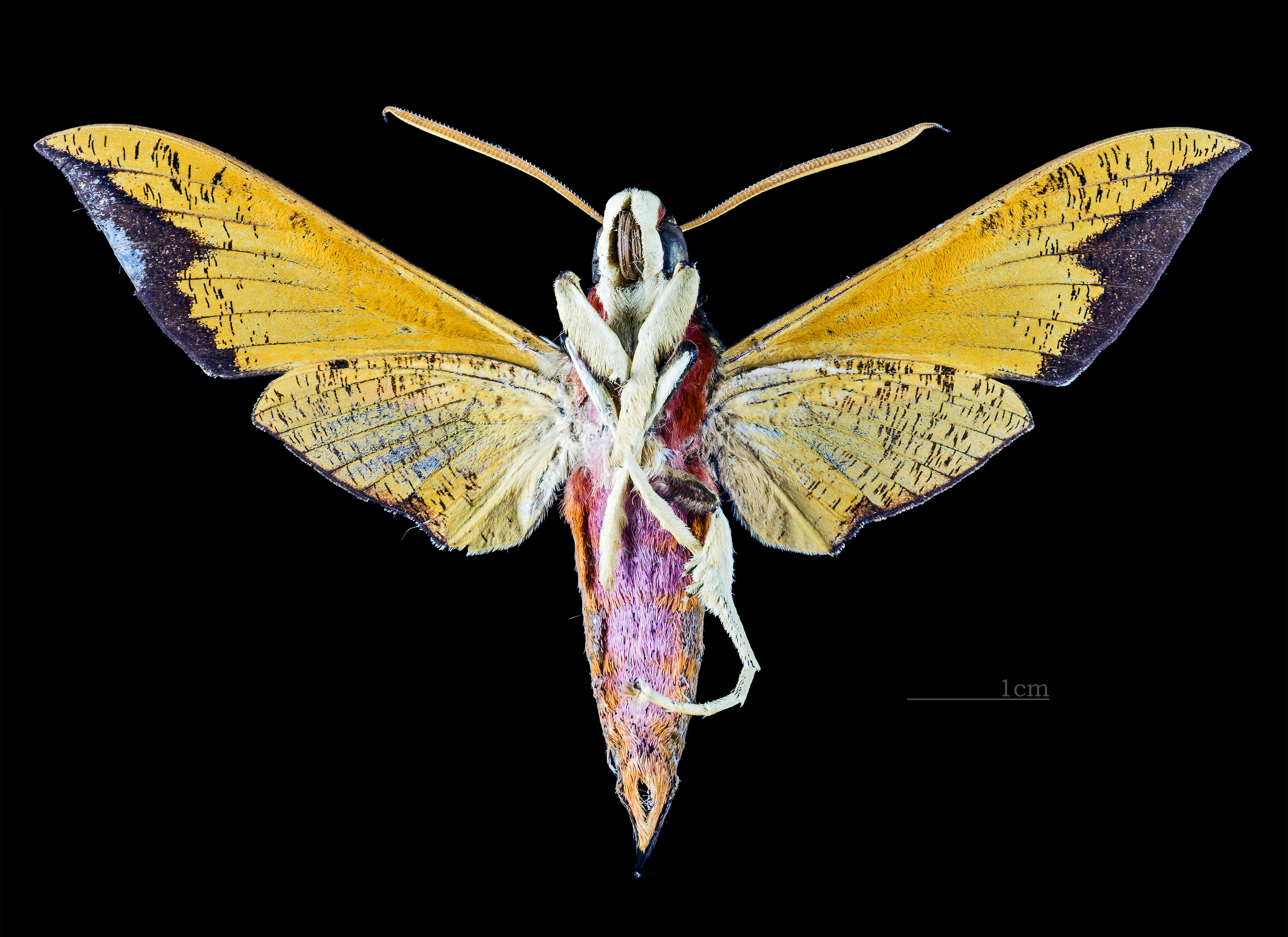
- Gnathothlibus brendelli ventral MHNT

Scientific classification
- Kingdom: Animalia
- Phylum: Arthropoda
- Class: Insecta
- Order: Lepidoptera
- Family: Sphingidae
- Genus: Gnathothlibus
- Species: G. brendelli

Binomial name
- Gnathothlibus brendelli Hayes, 1983

= Gnathothlibus brendelli =

Species of moth

Gnathothlibus brendelli is a moth of the family Sphingidae. It is known from Sulawesi.

The length of the forewings is about 46 mm.
