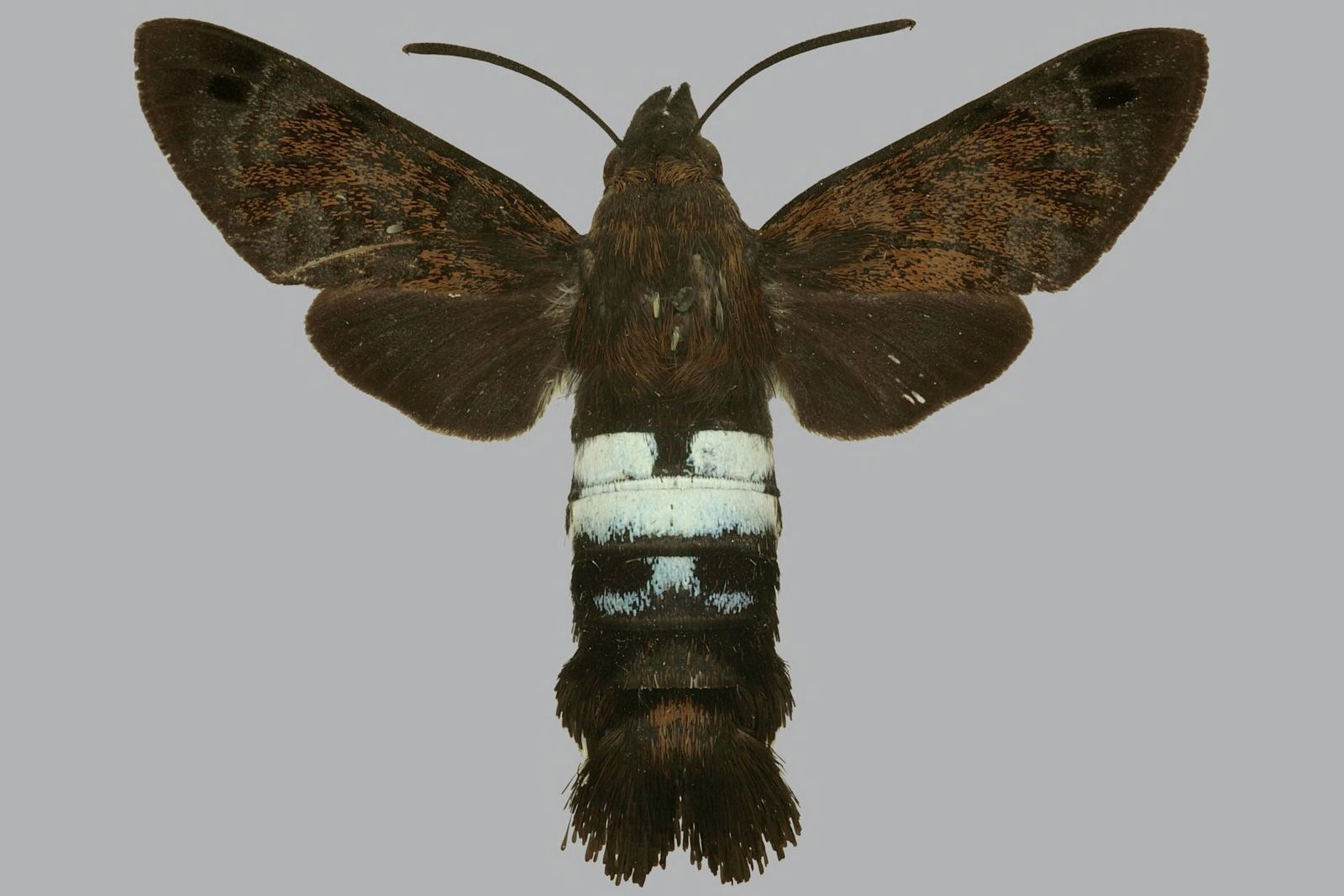

Scientific classification
- Kingdom: Animalia
- Phylum: Arthropoda
- Class: Insecta
- Order: Lepidoptera
- Family: Sphingidae
- Genus: Leucostrophus
- Species: L. commasiae

Binomial name
- Leucostrophus commasiae (Walker, 1856)

Synonyms
- Macroglossa commasiae Walker, 1856

= Leucostrophus commasiae =

Species of moth

Leucostrophus commasiae is a moth of the family Sphingidae. It is known from west Africa to Gabon and to Kasai in south-western Congo .
