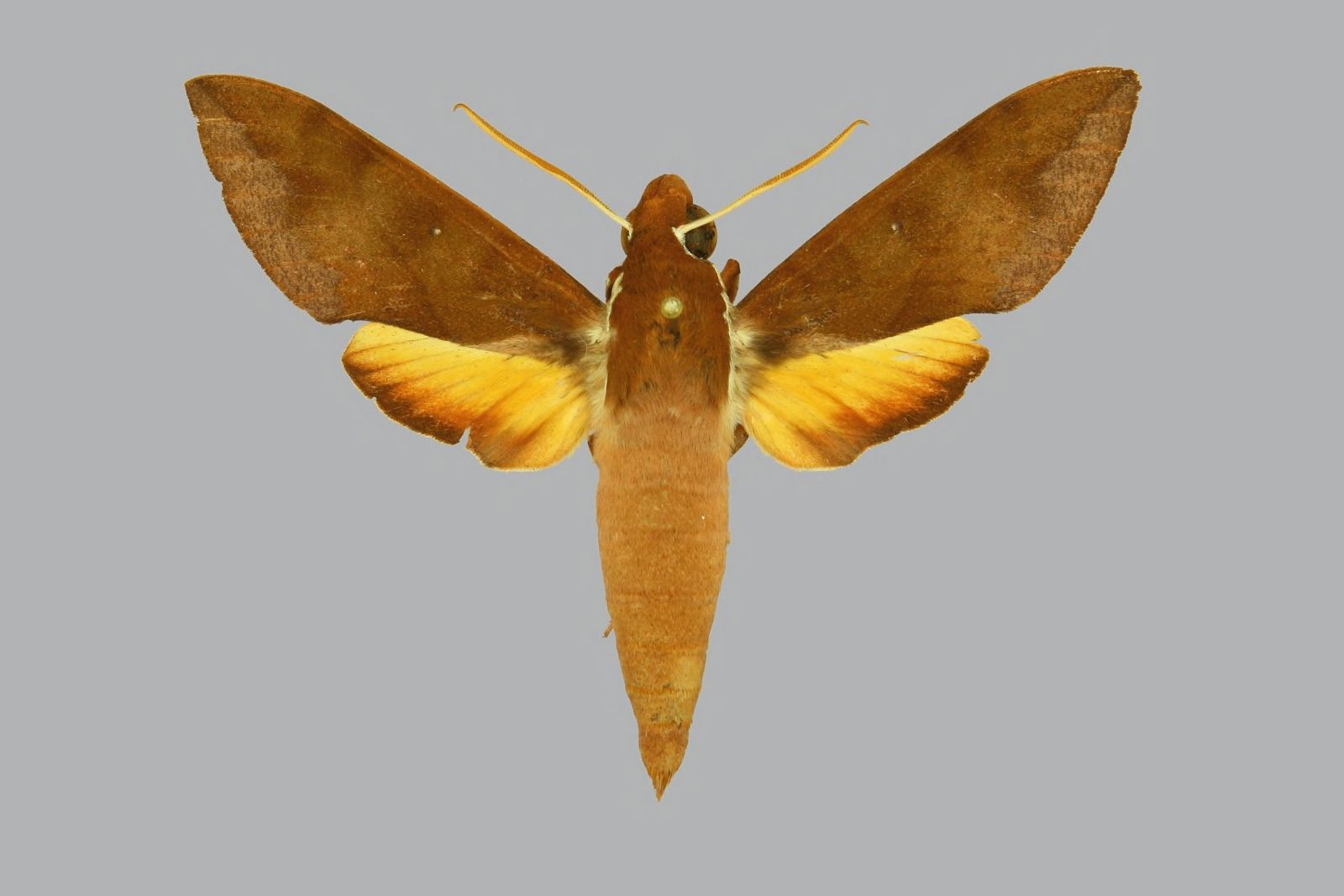
- Male

Scientific classification
- Kingdom: Animalia
- Phylum: Arthropoda
- Class: Insecta
- Order: Lepidoptera
- Family: Sphingidae
- Genus: Gnathothlibus
- Species: G. dabrera

Binomial name
- Gnathothlibus dabrera Eitschberger, 1999

= Gnathothlibus dabrera =

Species of moth

Gnathothlibus dabrera is a moth of the family Sphingidae. It is known from Sulawesi.
