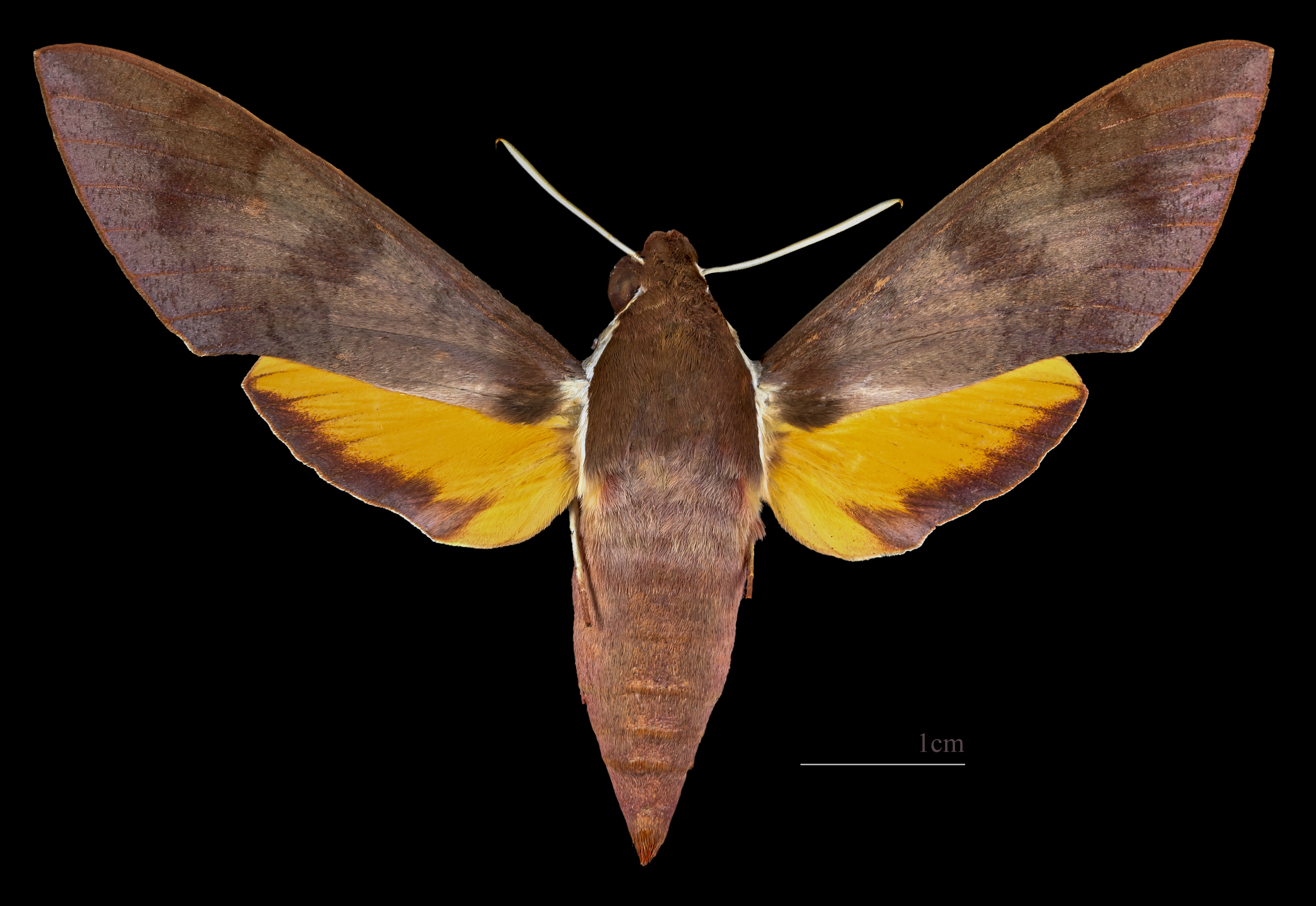
- Gnathothlibus erotus

Scientific classification
- Kingdom: Animalia
- Phylum: Arthropoda
- Class: Insecta
- Order: Lepidoptera
- Family: Sphingidae
- Subfamily: Macroglossinae
- Tribe: Macroglossini
- Subtribe: Macroglossina
- Genus: Gnathothlibus; Wallengren, 1858

Type species
- Gnathothlibus erotoides Wallengren, 1858

Species
- See text

Synonyms
- Chromis Hübner, 1819

= Gnathothlibus =

Genus of moths

Gnathothlibus is a genus of moths in the family Sphingidae.

== Species ==
- Gnathothlibus australiensis Lachlan, 2004
- Gnathothlibus brendelli Hayes, 1983
- Gnathothlibus dabrera Eitschberger, 1999
- Gnathothlibus eras (Boisduval, 1832)
- Gnathothlibus erotus (Cramer, 1777)
- Gnathothlibus fijiensis Lachlan, 2009
- Gnathothlibus heliodes (Meyrick, 1889)
- Gnathothlibus meeki Rothschild & Jordan, 1907
- Gnathothlibus saccoi Lachlan & Moulds, 2001
- Gnathothlibus samoaensis Lachlan, 2009
- Gnathothlibus vanuatuensis Lachlan & Moulds, 2003
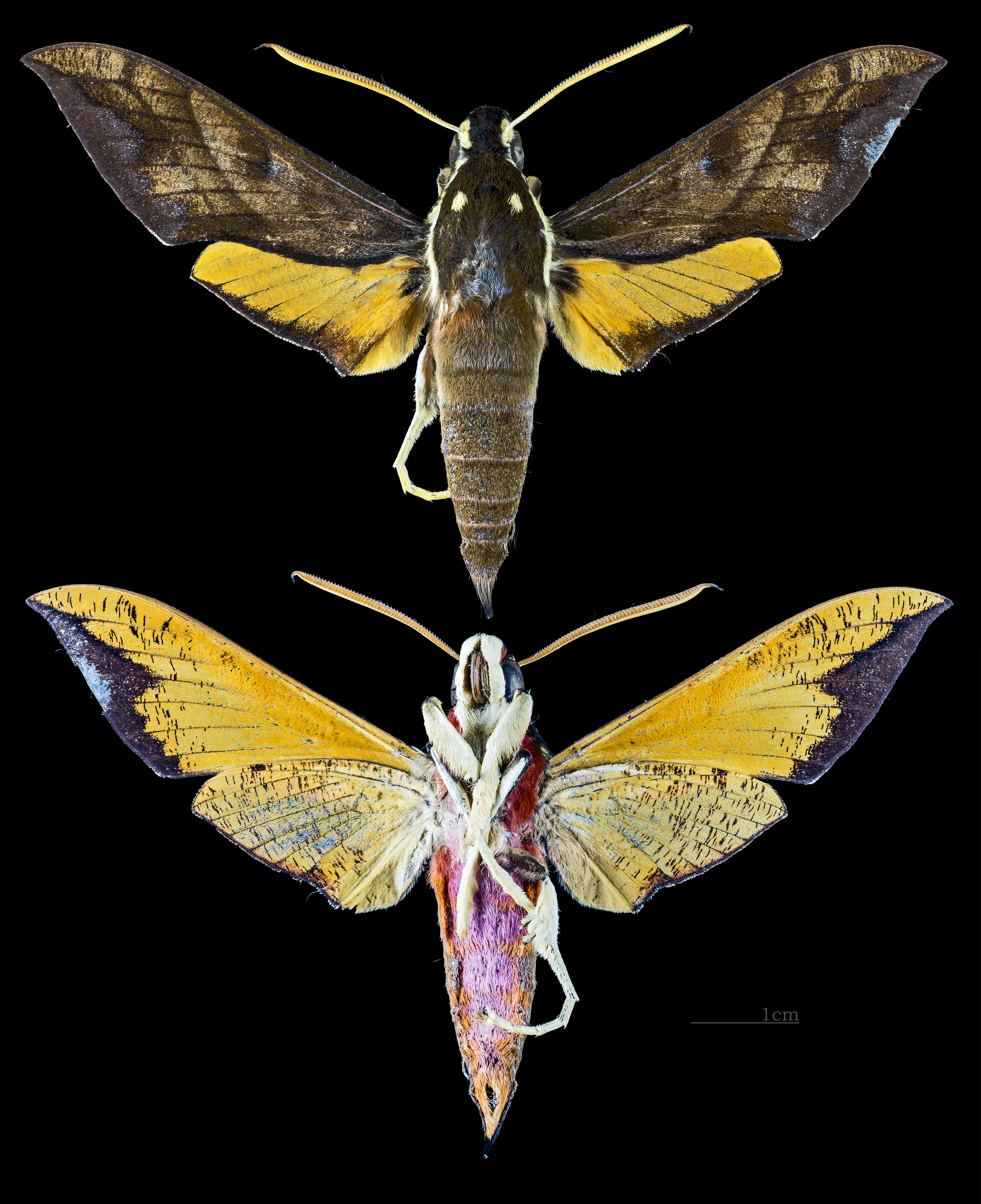
Gnathothlibus brendelli

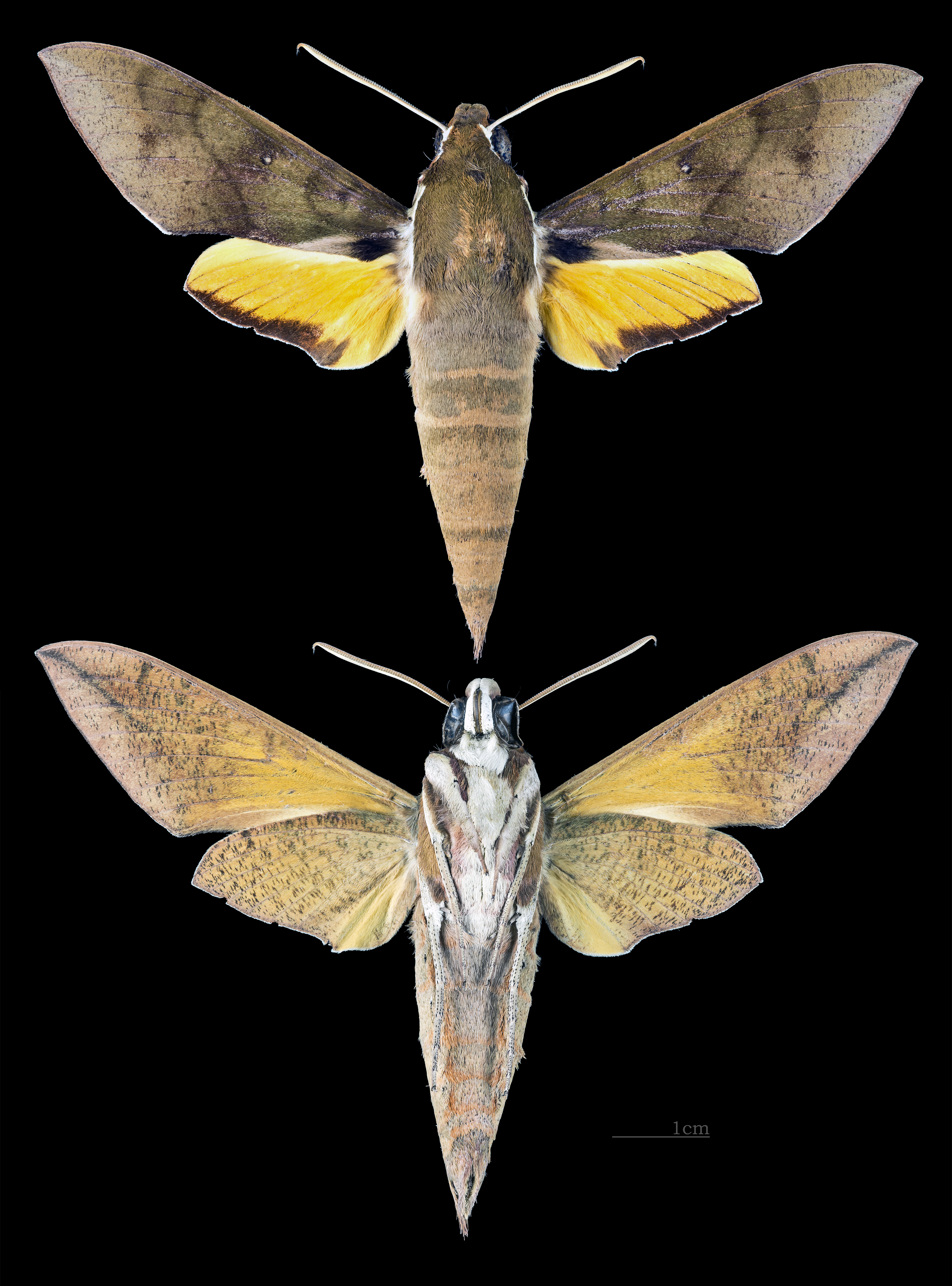
Gnathothlibus eras

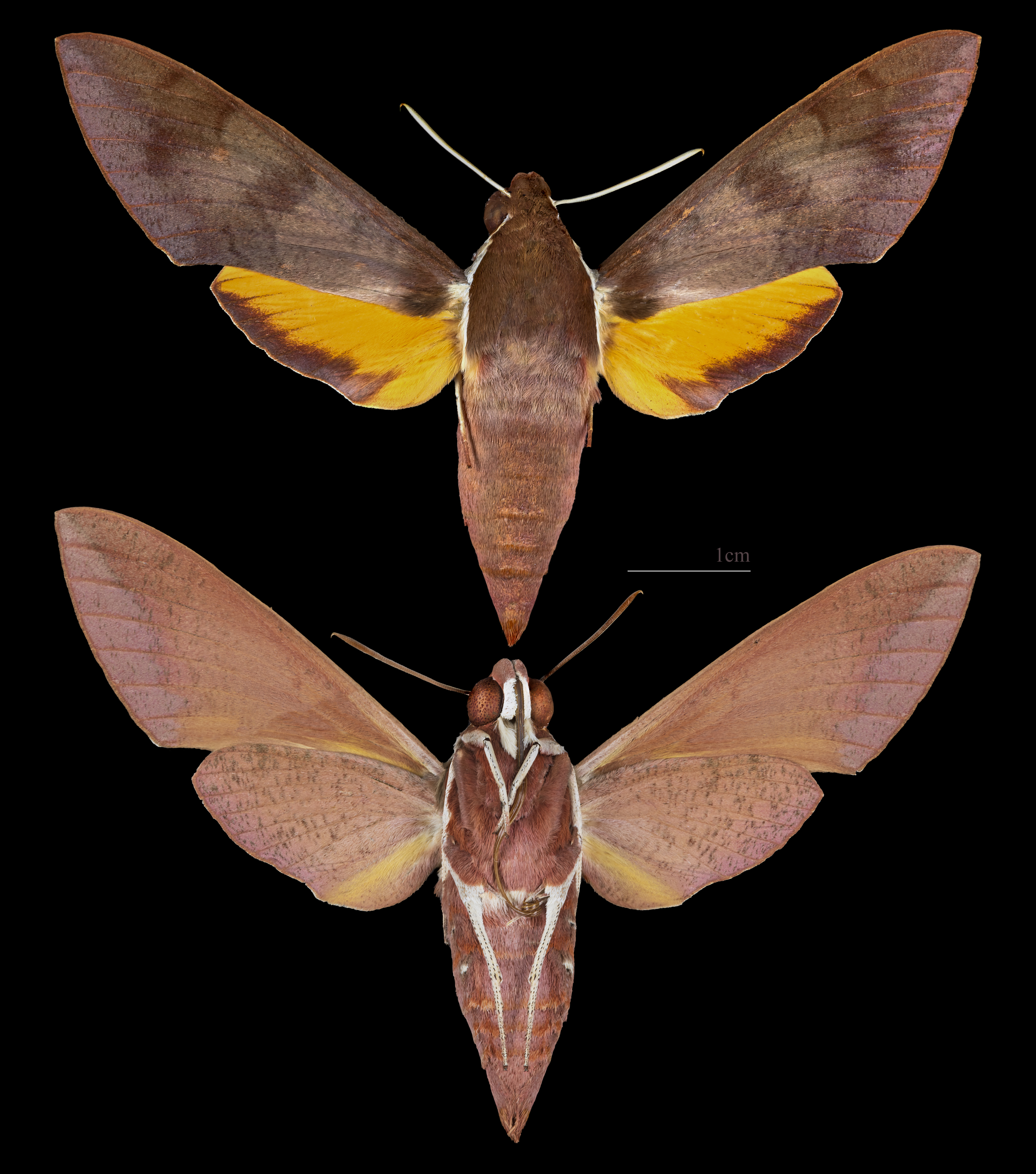
Gnathothlibus erotus

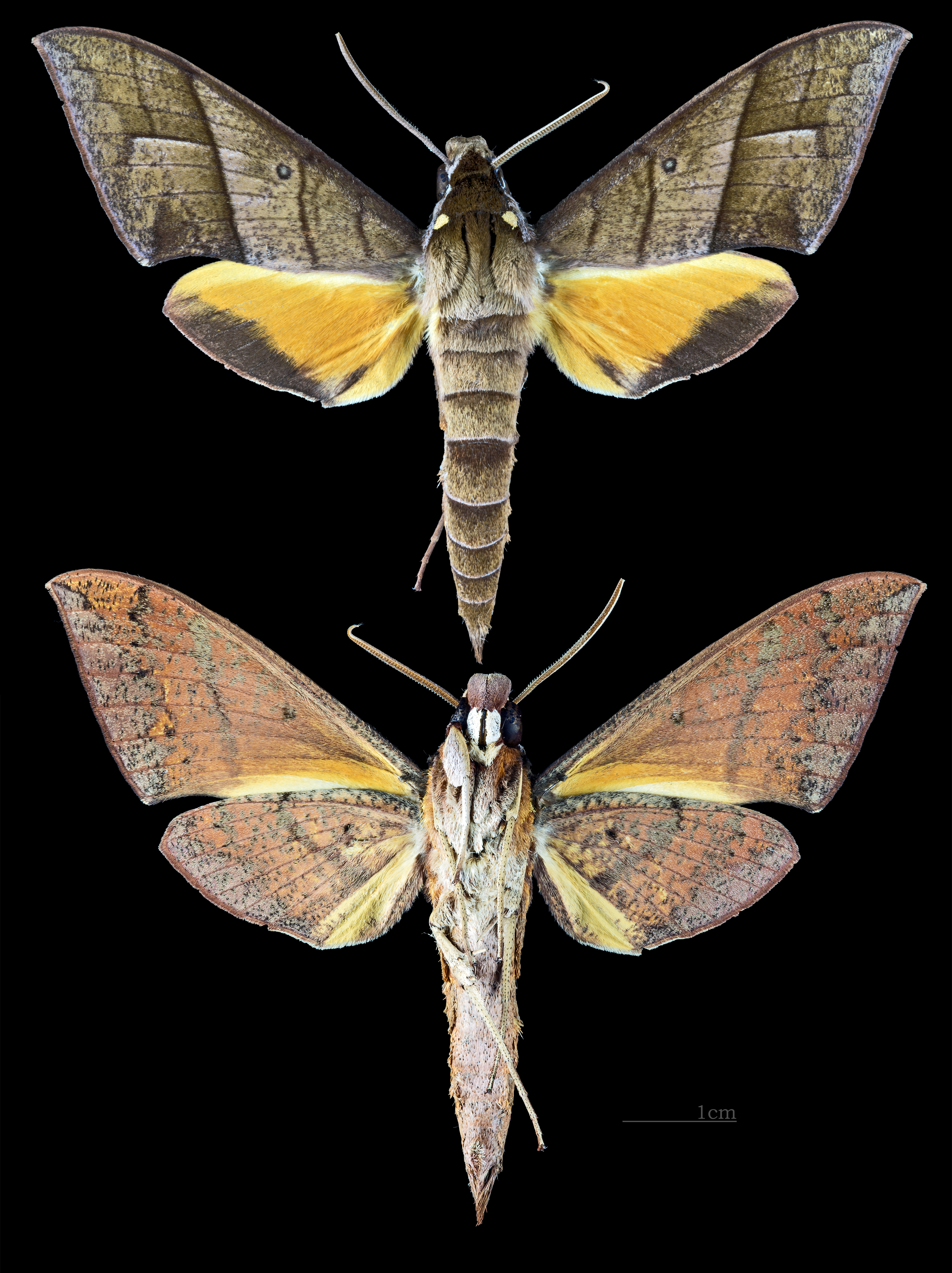
Gnathothlibus heliodes

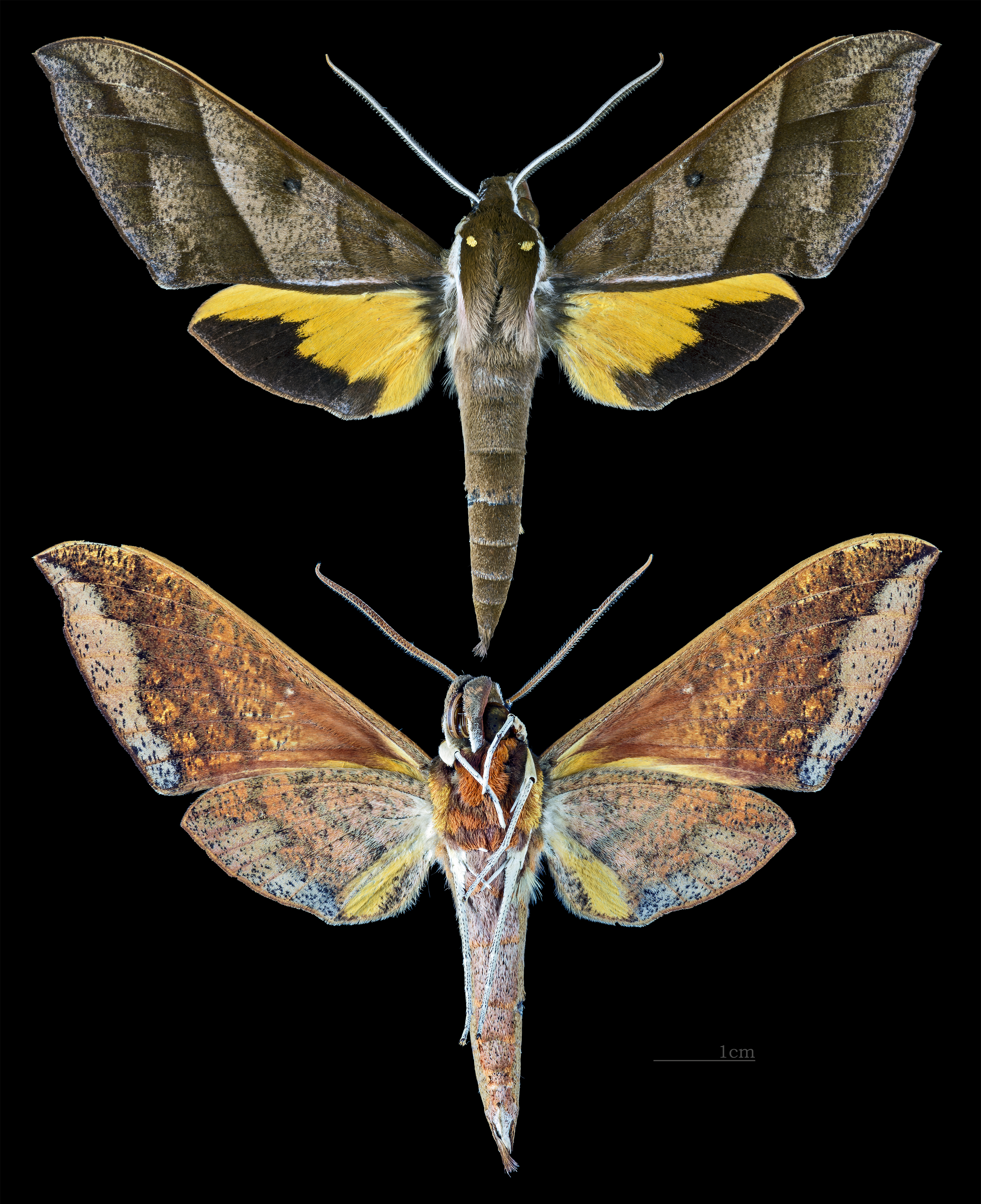
Gnathothlibus meeki

== Natural hybrid ==
- Gnathothlibus collardi Haxaire, 2002
