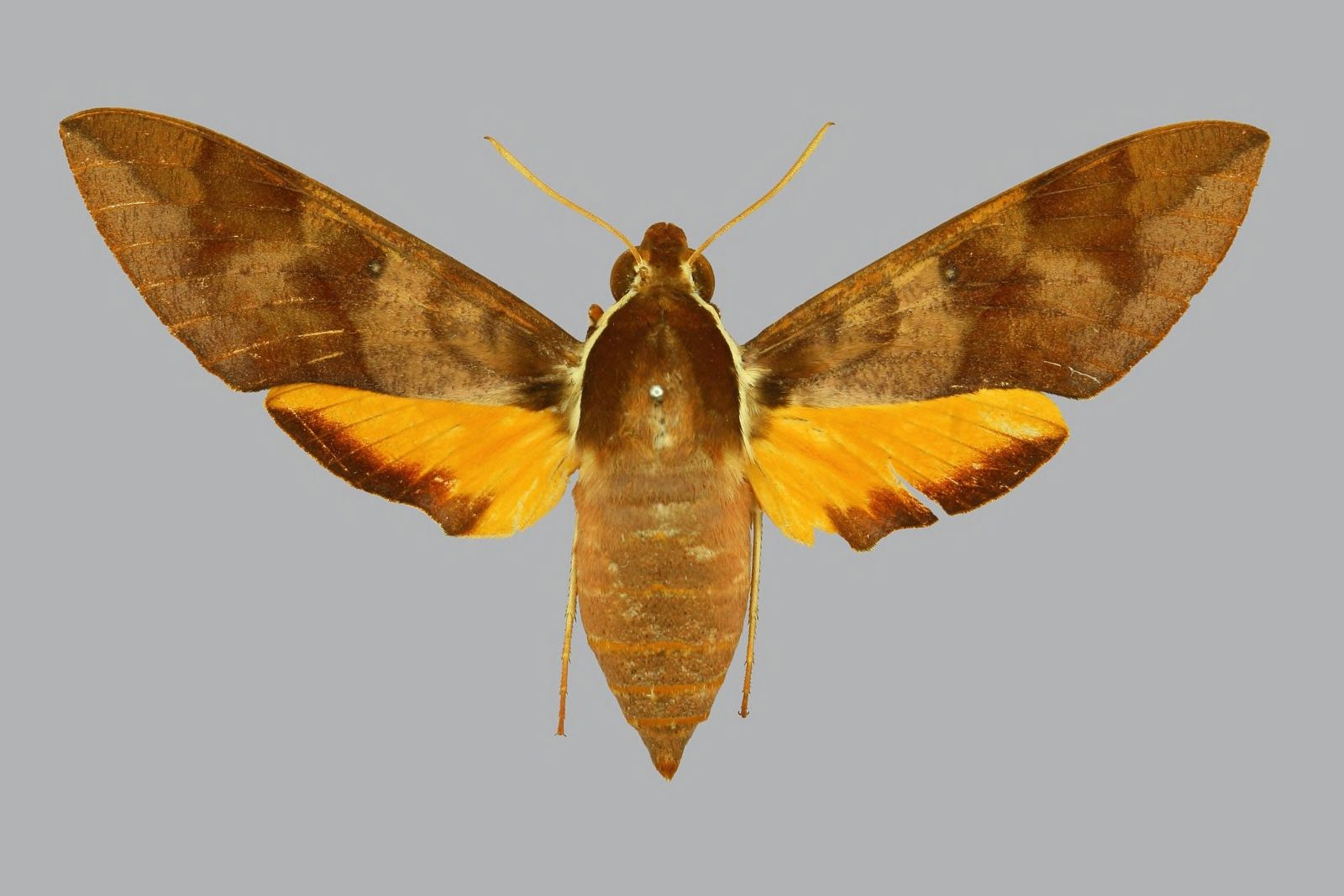
- Female

Scientific classification
- Domain: Eukaryota
- Kingdom: Animalia
- Phylum: Arthropoda
- Class: Insecta
- Order: Lepidoptera
- Family: Sphingidae
- Genus: Gnathothlibus
- Species: G. vanuatuensis

Binomial name
- Gnathothlibus vanuatuensis Lachlan & Moulds, 2003

= Gnathothlibus vanuatuensis =

Species of moth

Gnathothlibus vanuatuensis is a moth of the family Sphingidae that is endemic to Vanuatu.

== Description ==
The length of the forewings is 37.5–44.3 millimetres (1.48–1.74 in) for males and 39.5–40.7 millimetres (1.56–1.60 in) for females.
