= Poverty Inc. (Gary Null film) =

- Film poster
- Directed by: Gary Null; Valerie Van Cleve
- Written by: Richard Gale
- Produced by: Valerie Van Cleve; Richard Gale
- Cinematography: Peter Bonilla
- Edited by: Nicholas Pulcini; Valerie Van Cleve
- Release date: December 5, 2014
- Running time: 112 minutes
- Country: United States
- Language: English

Poverty Inc. is a 2014 film by Gary Null and Valerie Van Cleve which "claims that the Federal Reserve, like other central banks such as the International Monetary Fund and the World Bank, is a pyramid scheme."

The film, characterised as an "advocacy documentary", looks at the signing of the 1913 Federal Reserve Act by Woodrow Wilson and the demise of the Glass-Steagall Act, which it asserts "effectively turned Goldman Sachs from a financial casino into a commercial bank with full government coverage". The Federal Reserve is portrayed as "an unconstitutional lobbying body for commercial banks that prints money out of thin air".

== Critical reception ==
The Village Voice said that "Null’s movie [...] utterly fails to inform or guide. Every speaker seems to traffic in exclamation points, pretty much the only points that are made", characterising it as "a nightmare of attention deficit and hyperactivity" and "devoid of backup and evidence". The Los Angeles Times noted "sound bites indiscriminately collected from the likes of Ralph Nader and former Rep. Dennis Kucinich as well as seemingly random folks like a family doctor and the owner of a vintage clothing store". The New York Times said of the film that "it's not pleasant to be bludgeoned with rhetoric even if you subscribe to the film's premise".
