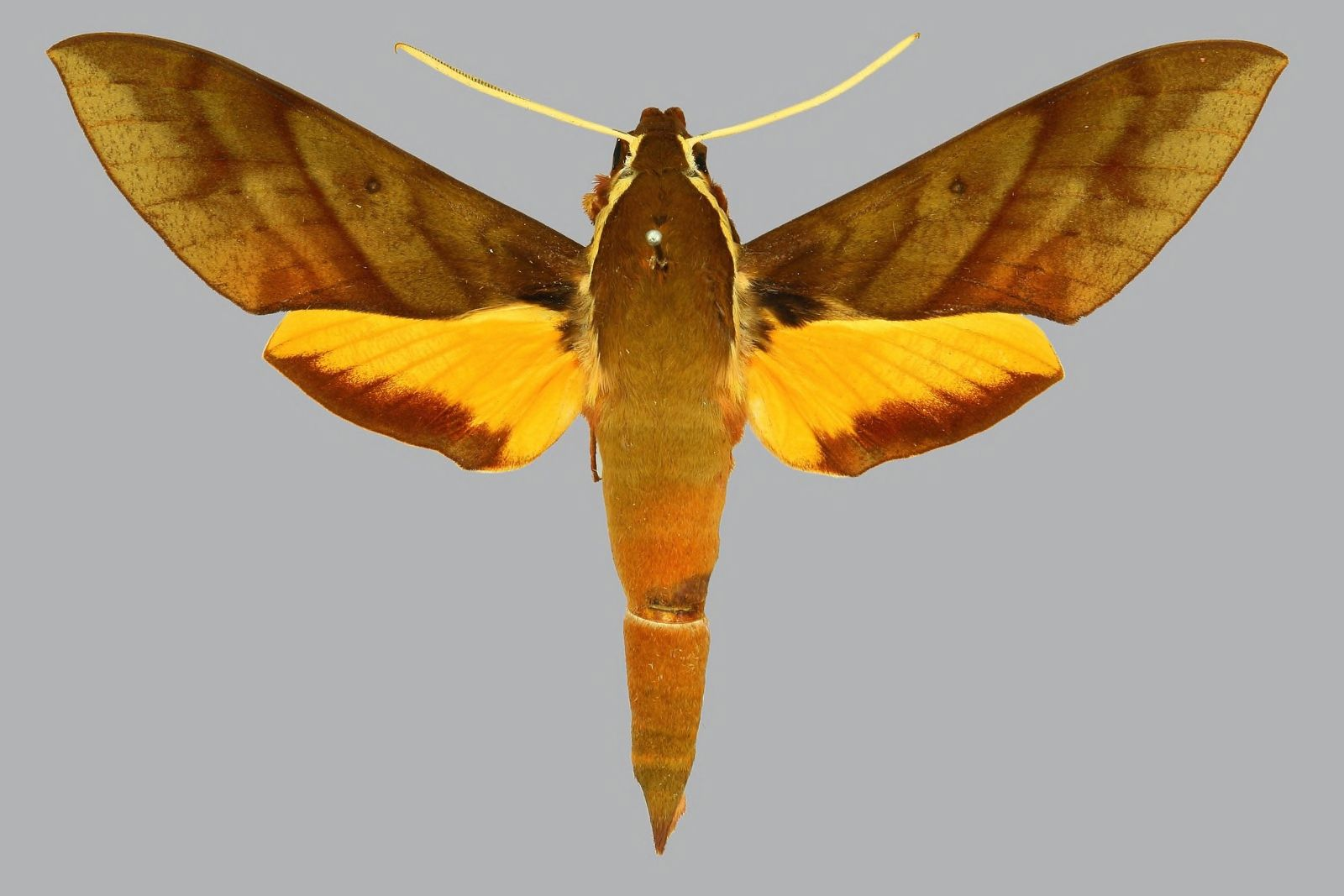
- Male

Scientific classification
- Kingdom: Animalia
- Phylum: Arthropoda
- Class: Insecta
- Order: Lepidoptera
- Family: Sphingidae
- Genus: Gnathothlibus
- Species: G. saccoi

Binomial name
- Gnathothlibus saccoi Lachlan & Moulds, 2001

Synonyms
- Gnathothlibus malleri Schmit, 2002

= Gnathothlibus saccoi =

Species of moth

Gnathothlibus saccoi is a moth of the family Sphingidae. It is known from Vanuatu.

The length of the forewings is 42–49 mm for males and 52–57 mm for females.
