= Townsend Letter =

American alternative medicine magazine

- Editor-in-Chief: Jonathan Collin, MD
- Categories: Alternative medicine
- Frequency: Ten times per year
- Paid circulation: 6000
- Founder: Jonathan Collin, MD
- Founded: 1983
- First issue: 1983
- Country: United States
- Based in: Port Townsend, Washington
- Language: English
- Website: www.townsendletter.com
- ISSN: 1940-5464

Townsend Letter, formerly Townsend Letter for Doctors, then Townsend Letter for Doctors & Patients, is a periodical focusing on alternative medicine which has been in circulation since 1983.

The website Quackwatch has listed the Townsend Letter on its list of magazines as non-recommended and fundamentally flawed.

== Abstracting and indexing ==
Townsend Letter is abstracted and indexed by EBSCO Publishing, Gale, and the British Library.
