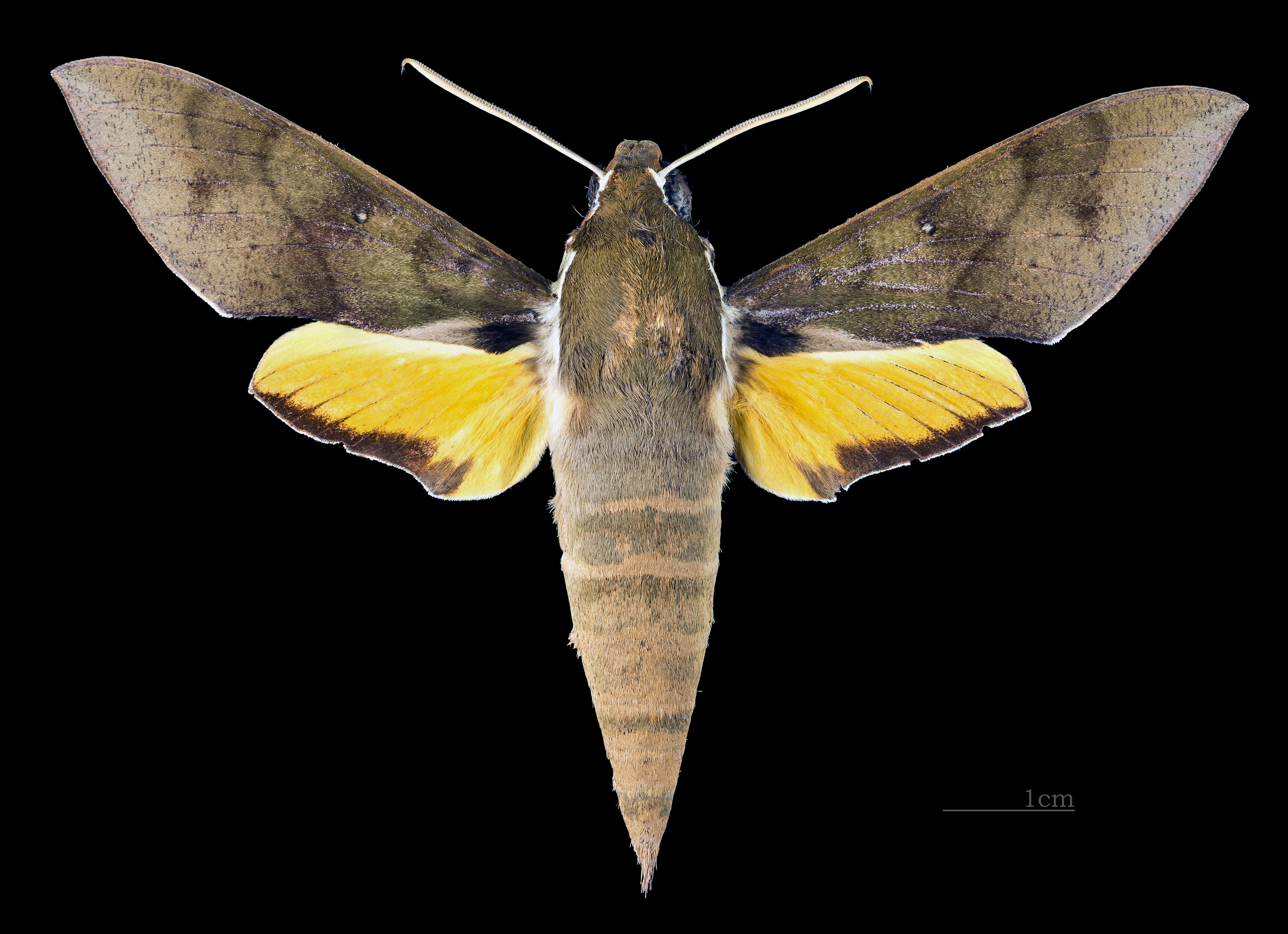
- Gnathothlibus eras Dorsal MHNT
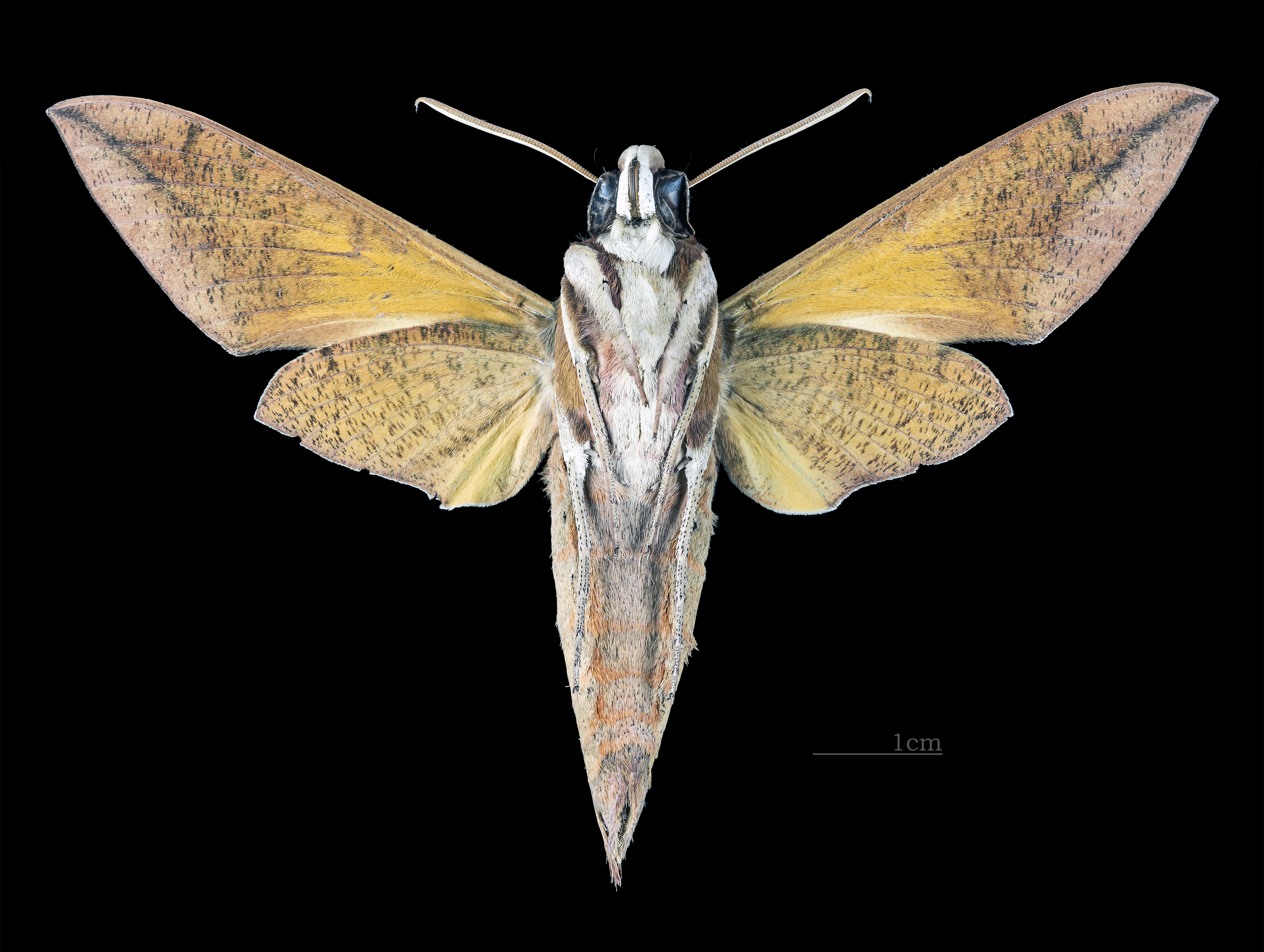
- Gnathothlibus eras Ventral MHNT

Scientific classification
- Kingdom: Animalia
- Phylum: Arthropoda
- Class: Insecta
- Order: Lepidoptera
- Family: Sphingidae
- Genus: Gnathothlibus
- Species: G. eras

Binomial name
- Gnathothlibus eras (Boisduval, 1832)

Synonyms
- Deilephila eras Boisduval, 1832; Chaerocampa sapor Koch, 1865; Chromis erotus cramptoni Clark, 1922; Gnathothlibus erotoides Wallengren, 1858

= Gnathothlibus eras =

Species of moth

Gnathothlibus eras is a moth of the family Sphingidae.

== Distribution ==
It is known from the eastern Sunda Islands (from Java eastward), Sulawesi, the Moluccas, the Philippines, New Guinea, the Solomon Islands, Micronesia and eastern Australia.

== Gallery ==
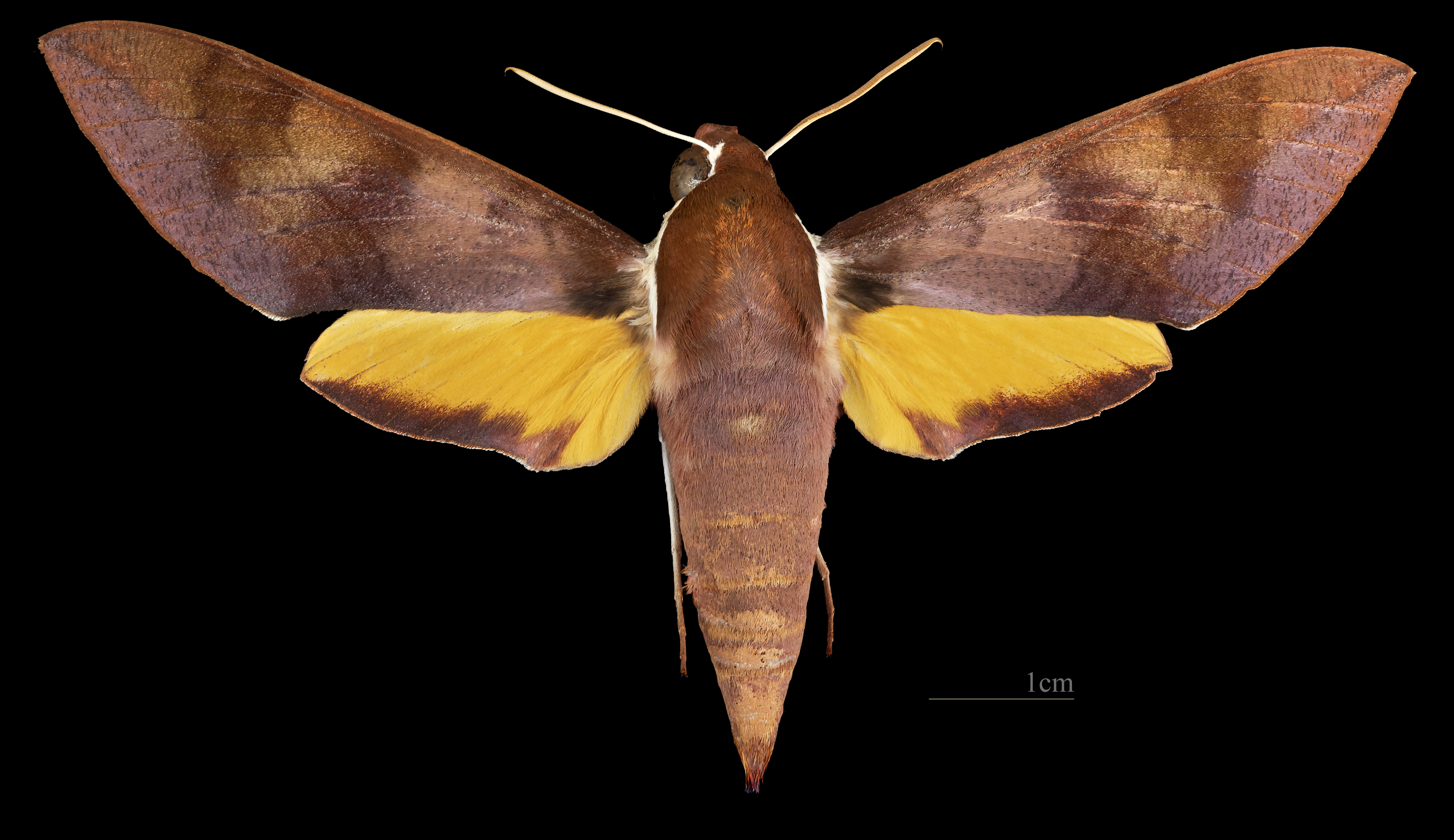
Female dorsal

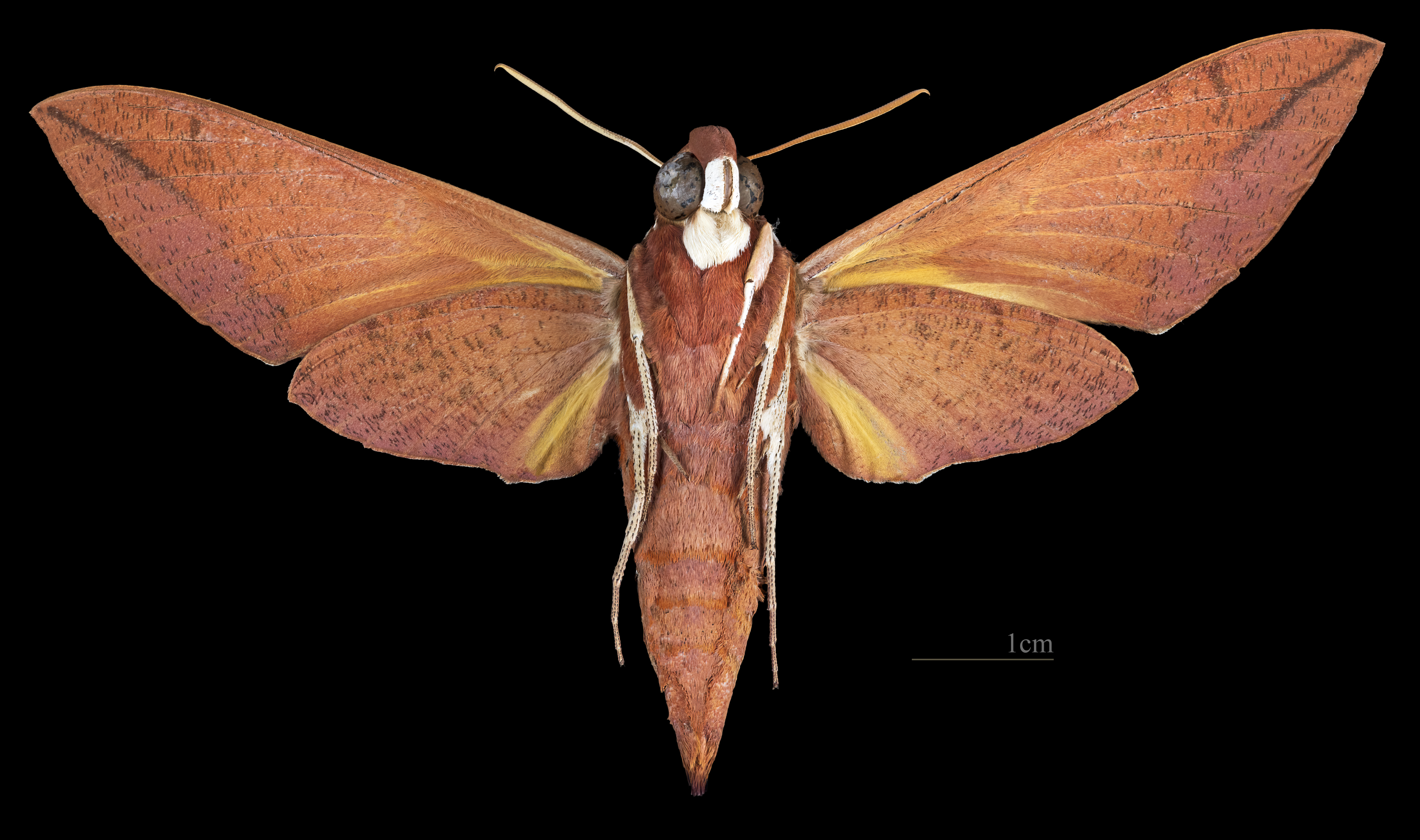
Female ventral
