= L. tinctoria =

L. tinctoria may refer to:

- Leea tinctoria, a plant species endemic to São Tomé and Príncipe
- Lomatia tinctoria, (Labill.) R.Br., a plant species in the genus Lomatia found in Australia

== See also ==
- Tinctoria
