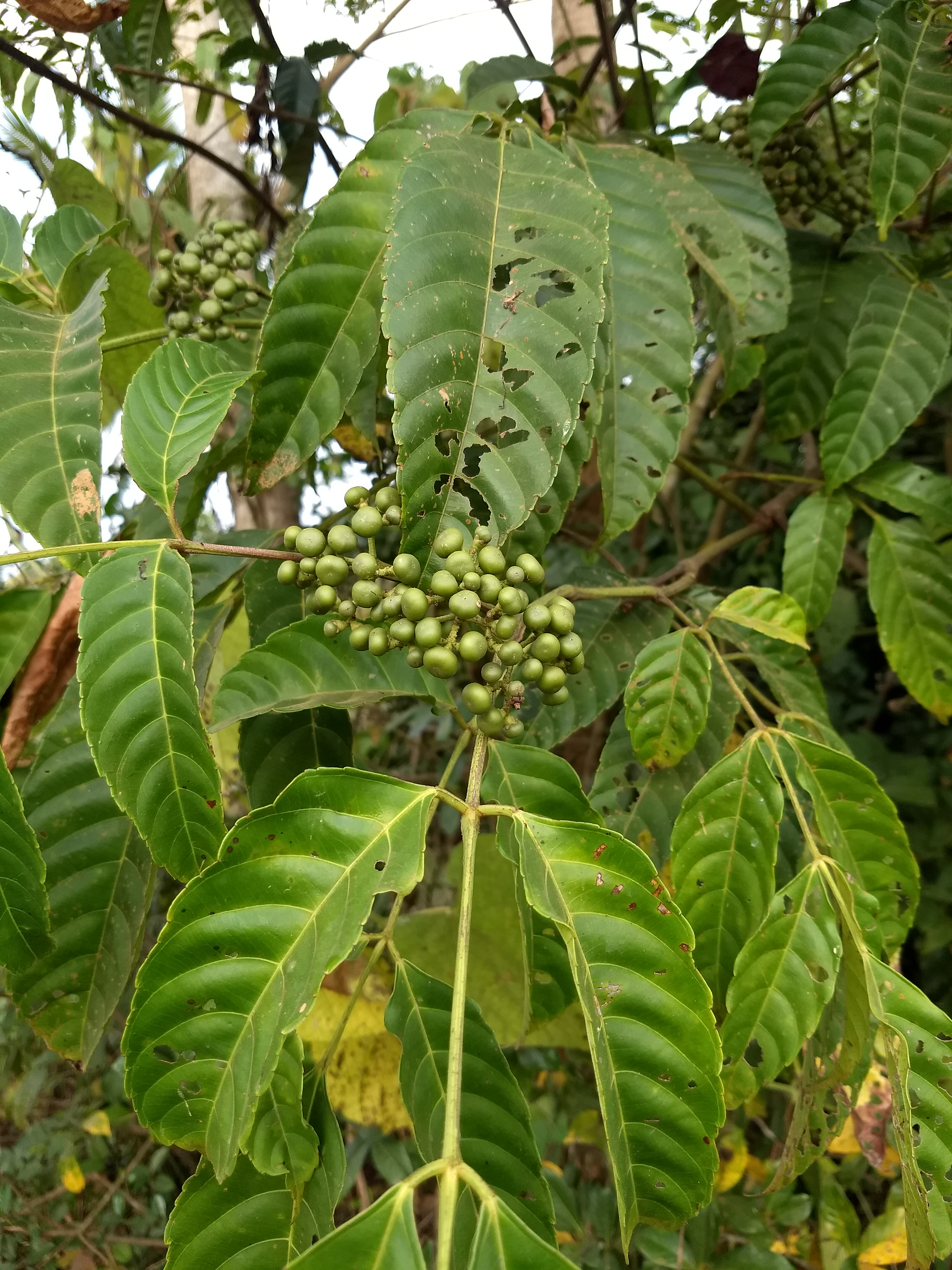
- Foliage and immature fruit

Conservation status
- Least Concern (IUCN 3.1)

Scientific classification
- Kingdom: Plantae
- Clade: Tracheophytes
- Clade: Angiosperms
- Clade: Eudicots
- Clade: Rosids
- Order: Vitales
- Family: Vitaceae
- Genus: Leea
- Species: L. indica

Binomial name
- Leea indica (Burm.f.) Merr.

Synonyms
- Staphylea indica Burm.f.; Aquilicia sambucina L.; Leea sambucina Willd.; Aquilicia ottilis Gaertn.; Leea ottilis DC.; Leea sambucina var. occidentalis C.B.Clarke; Otillis zeylanica Gaertn.

= Leea indica =

Species of shrub

Leea indica is a large shrub in the family Vitaceae which may grow up to 5 m (16 ft) tall. It is common in undergrowth of secondary and disturbed evergreen forests in Indomalaya, Indochina, and throughout in the Western Ghats of India. Plants growing in Malesia, New Guinea, Australia and southwestern Pacific islands were previously identified as this species but are now considered to be the separate species Leea nova-guineensis.

== In religion ==
In India, stem of this plant is used in post-funeral rituals of Hindus.
