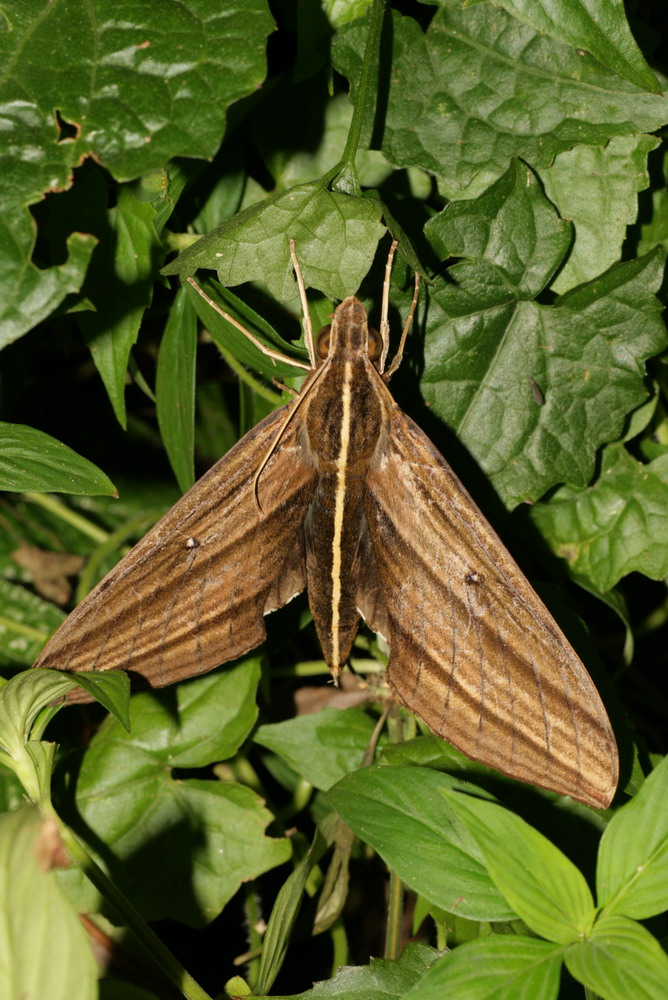

Scientific classification
- Domain: Eukaryota
- Kingdom: Animalia
- Phylum: Arthropoda
- Class: Insecta
- Order: Lepidoptera
- Family: Sphingidae
- Genus: Elibia
- Species: E. dolichus

Binomial name
- Elibia dolichus (Westwood, 1847)

Synonyms
- Sphinx dolichus Westwood, 1847; Elibia linigera Boisduval, 1875

= Elibia dolichus =

Species of moth

Elibia dolichus is a moth of the family Sphingidae first described by John O. Westwood in 1847. It is found in Nepal, north-eastern India, Bangladesh, Myanmar, Thailand, southern China, Malaysia (Peninsular, Sarawak, Sabah), Indonesia (Sumatra, Kalimantan, Java) to the Philippines (Palawan Island).

== Description ==
The wingspan is 120–146 mm.

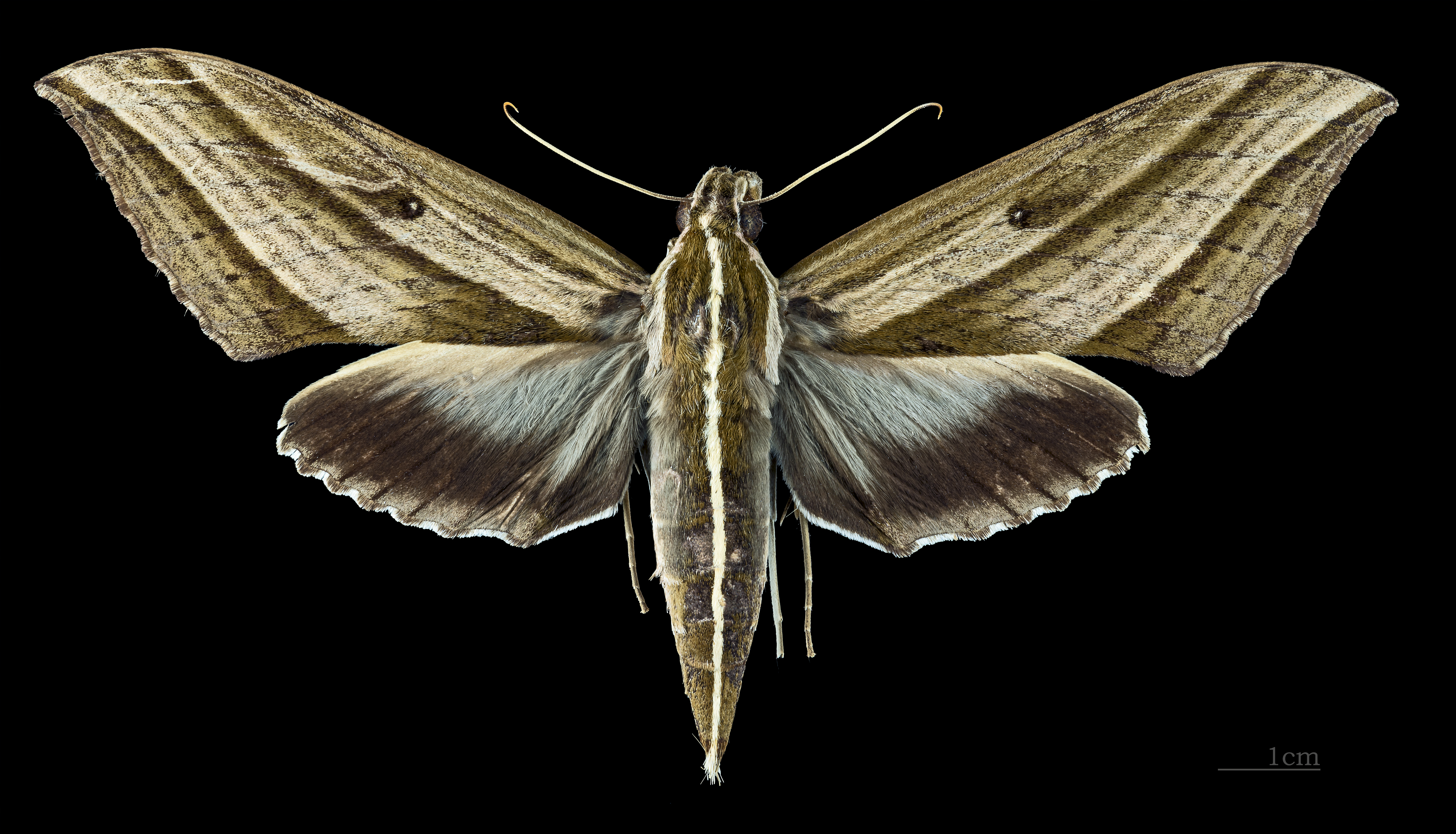
Female

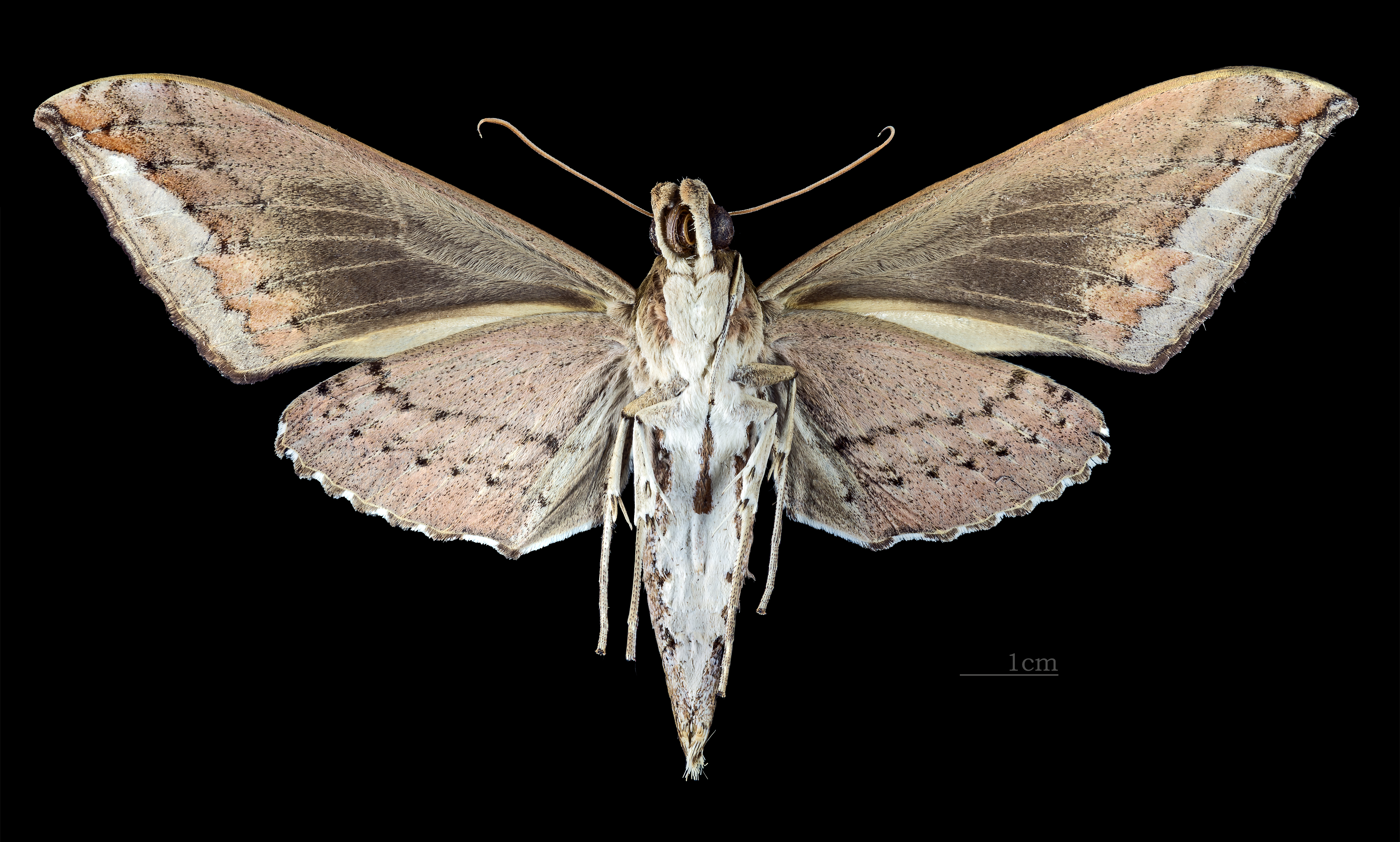
Female underside

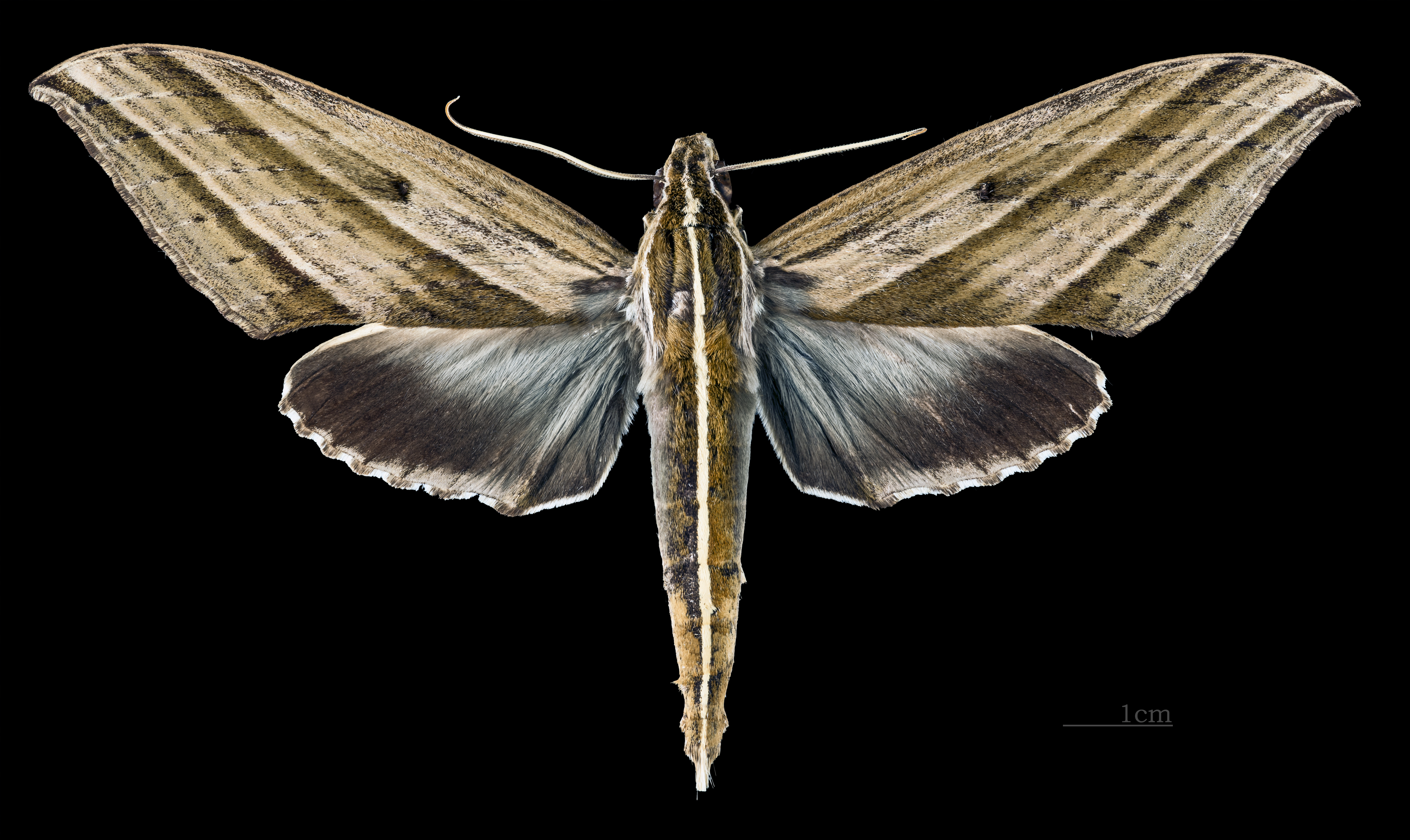
Male

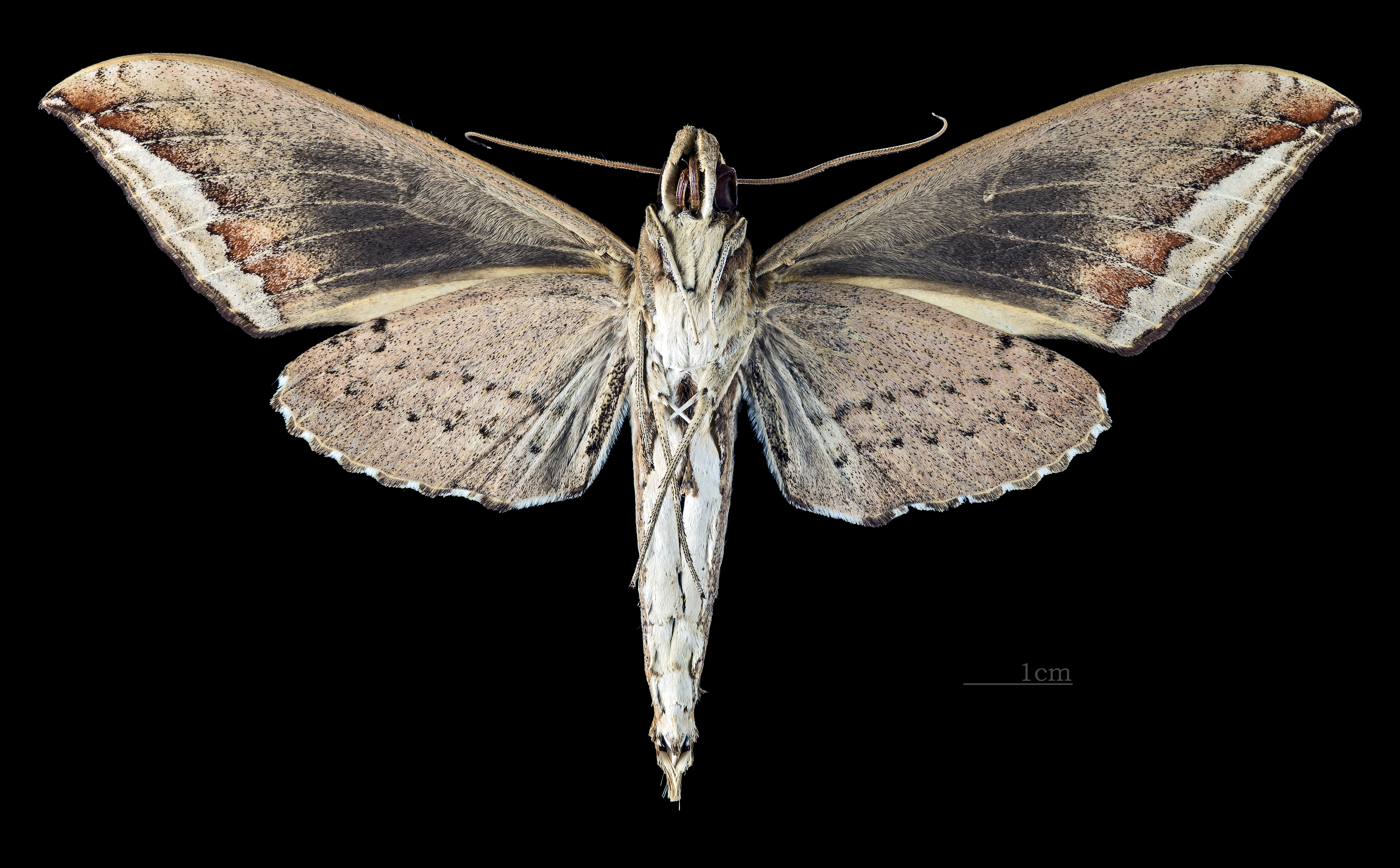
Male underside

== Biology ==
The larvae feed on Saurauia, Leea, Cayratia and Tetrastigma species.
