= David van Royen (1699–1764) =

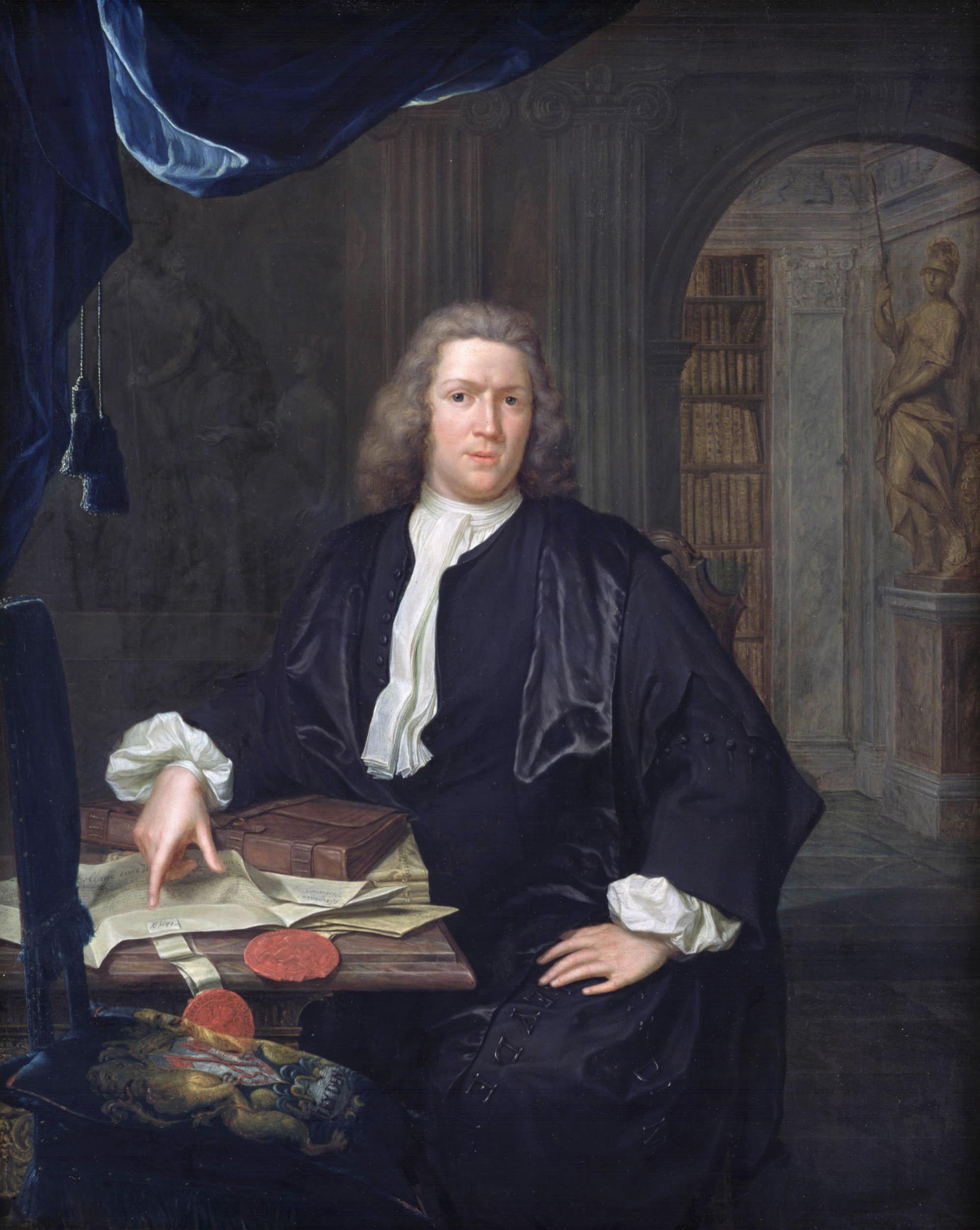
- Hieronymus van der Mij: David van Royen (1699–1764); Stedelijk Museum De Lakenhal, Leiden
- Born: 5 April 1699; Leiden, the Dutch Republic
- Died: 22 February 1764; Leiden, the Dutch Republic
- Education: Leiden University
- Spouse: Catharina van den Bergh
- Children: David van Royen
- Scientific career
- Fields: Law, library science
- Workplaces: Leiden University
- Thesis: Dissertatio juridica inauguralis, de finibus regundis

David van Royen (Leiden, 5 April 1699 – Leiden, 22 February 1764) was a Dutch lawyer, administrator and university librarian. He was the father of the well-known medical doctor and botanist David van Royen.

== Family and education ==
Van Royen, a scion of the patrician Van Roijen (nl) family, was born the son of Jan Davidsz. van Royen and Cornelia van Groenendijck. Young Van Royen read law at Leiden and obtained a Doctor's degree on 5 February 1720 with the thesis Dissertatio juridica inauguralis, de finibus regundis. In 1725 he married Catharina van den Bergh.

== Career ==
Initially he worked as a griffier, later, from 1725 up to 1753, he was secretary of the curatoren of Leiden University. In 1758 he started secretary of the Dutch government High council Raad van State.

When Van Royen was Leiden University librarian for four months in 1741, he composed an extensive report on the history and condition of Leiden University Library. He took care to procure a safe storage for the antiquarian collection of Gerard van Papenbroek, starting a collection of Greek and Roman sculpture, one of the sources of the later Rijksmuseum van Oudheden at Leiden.

== Publications ==
His publications include:

- van Royen, David (1720). Dissertatio juridica inauguralis, de finibus regundis (in Latin). Lugdunum Batavorum [Leiden]: Samuel Luchtmans.
- van Royen, David (1743). Schriftelijk Rapport van Mr. David van Royen, Secretaris van de Ed. Groot Achtbare Heeren Curateuren over 's Lands Universiteit binnen Leijden [Written Report of Mr. David van Royen, Secretary of the Noble Great Honourable Lords Curators of the National University within Leiden] (in Dutch). Leiden.

== Sources ==
- Berkvens-Stevelinck, Christiane (2012). Magna commoditas : Leiden University's great asset : 425 years library collections and services. Translated by UvA Talen, Amsterdam. Leiden: Leiden University Press. pp. 103, 123, 126–127, 161. ISBN 9789087281656. OCLC 794706996. 303 pages.
- Hulshoff Pol, Elfriede (1975). "The Library". In Lunsingh Scheurleer, Th. H.; Posthumus Meyjes, G.H.M.; Bachrach, Alfred Gustave Herbert (eds.). Leiden University in the seventeenth century : an exchange of learning. Leiden: Brill. pp. 398, 451. ISBN 9789004042674. OCLC 1676723. 496 pages.
