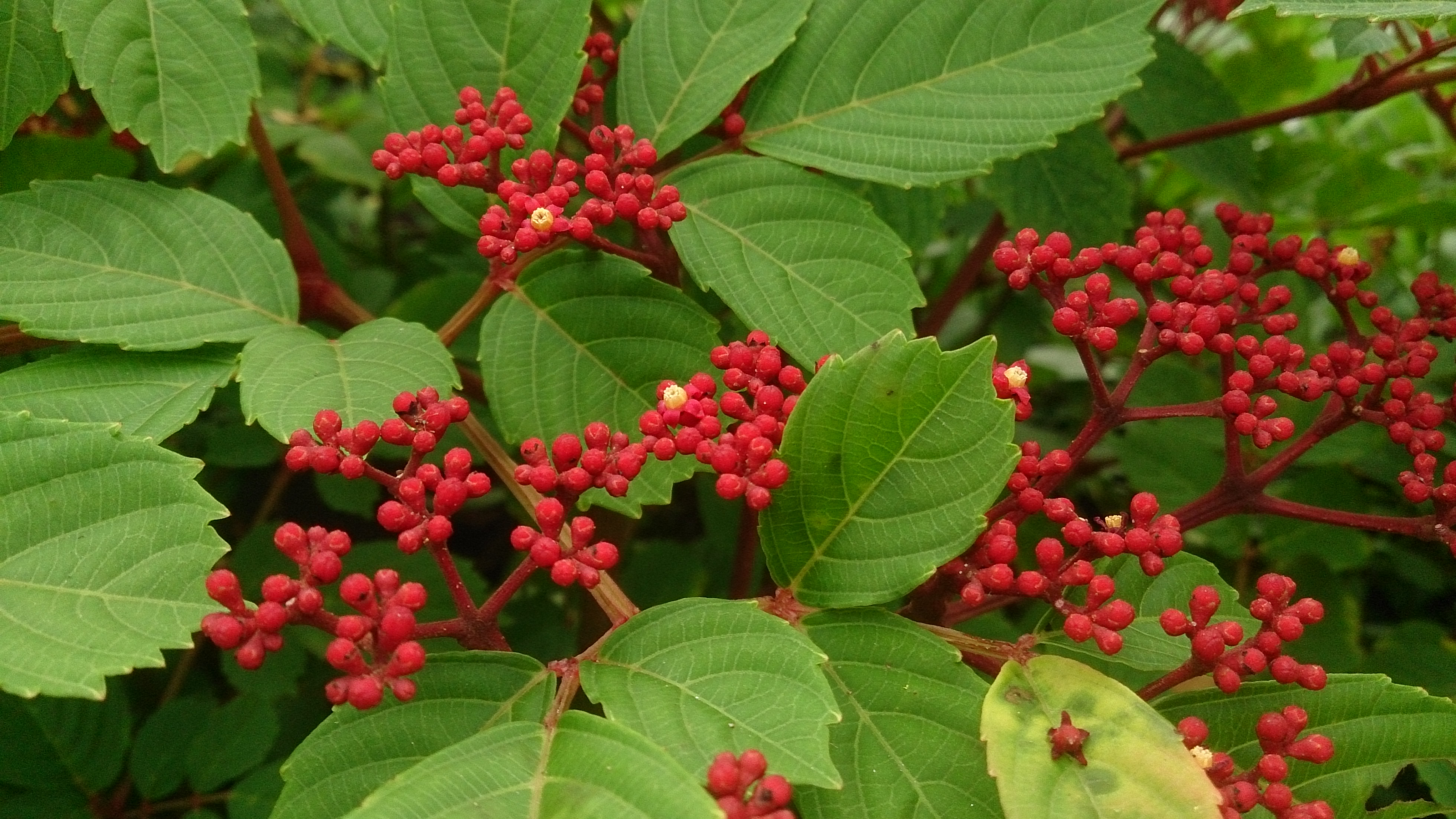
- Foliage and flower buds

Conservation status
- Least Concern (NCA)

Scientific classification
- Kingdom: Plantae
- Clade: Tracheophytes
- Clade: Angiosperms
- Clade: Eudicots
- Clade: Rosids
- Order: Vitales
- Family: Vitaceae
- Genus: Leea
- Species: L. rubra

Binomial name
- Leea rubra Blume

Synonyms
- Leea brunoniana C.B.Clarke; Leea linearifolia C.B.Clarke; Leea polyphylla Miq.; Leea rubra var. apiifolia Zipp. ex Miq.; Leea rubra f. celebica Koord.; Leea rubra var. polyphylla (Miq.) Miq.; Leea sambucina Blanco nom. illeg.; Leea sanguinea Wall. ex Bojer nom. illeg.; Leea sanguinea Kurz

= Leea rubra =

Red leea

Species of flowering plant

Leea rubra, commonly known as red leea, is a plant in the family Vitaceae native to Bangladesh, Assam, Myanmar, Laos, Thailand, Cambodia, Vietnam, Malaysia, Borneo, the Philippines, New Guinea, the Northern Territory and Queensland. It is a small shrub growing up to 3 m (9.8 ft) tall with 2-, 3- or 4-pinnate leaves. The flower buds and stems are bright red, the five petals may be cream, pink or red. The fruit is a red, purple or black berry about 11 mm (0.43 in) diameter containing 4-6 seeds.

The red leea grows in rainforest as an understory plant, at altitudes from sea level to about 400 m (1,300 ft).

== Conservation ==
This species is listed by the Queensland Department of Environment and Science as least concern. As of 13 July 2023, it has not been assessed by the International Union for Conservation of Nature (IUCN).

== Gallery ==
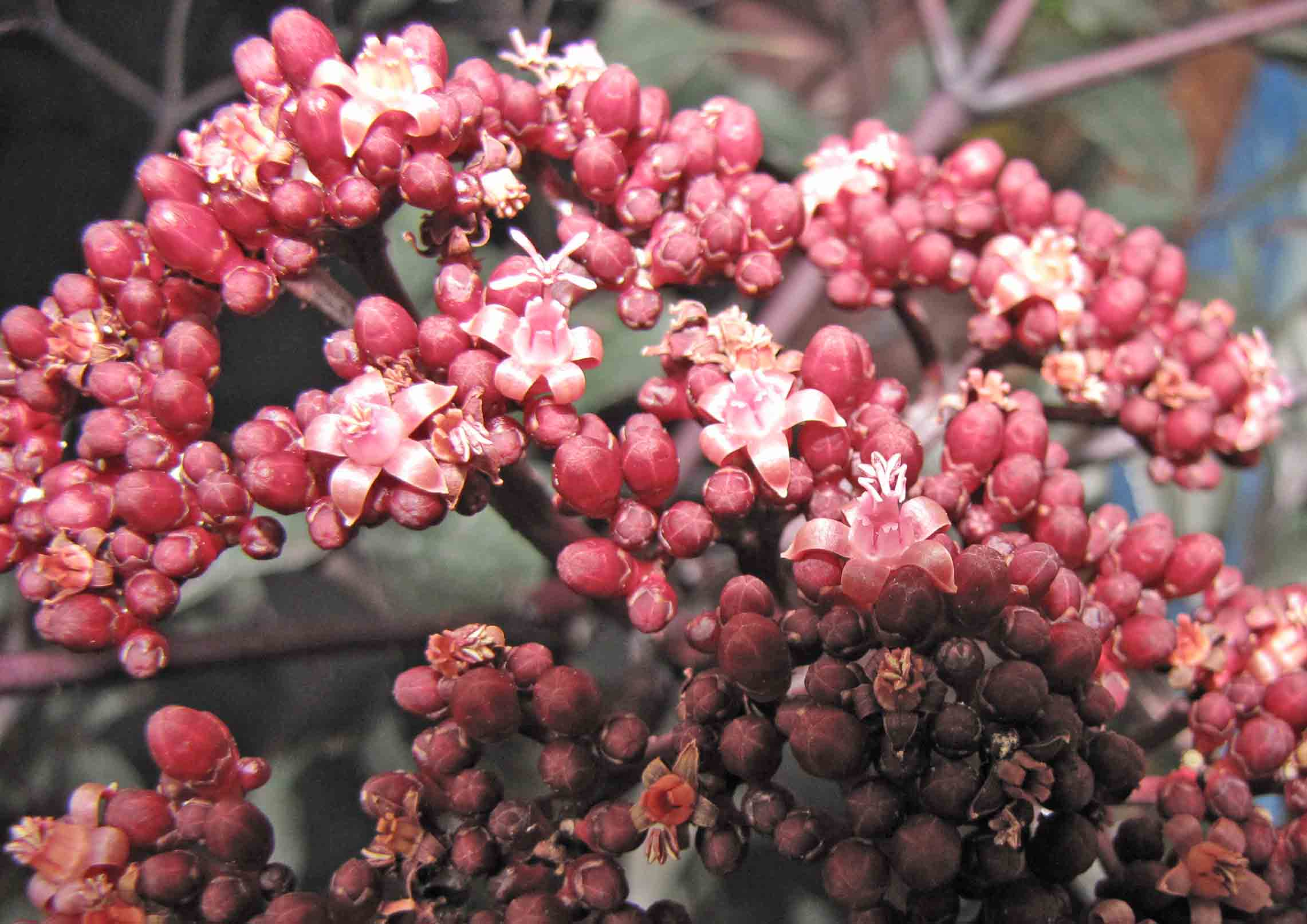
Inflorescence

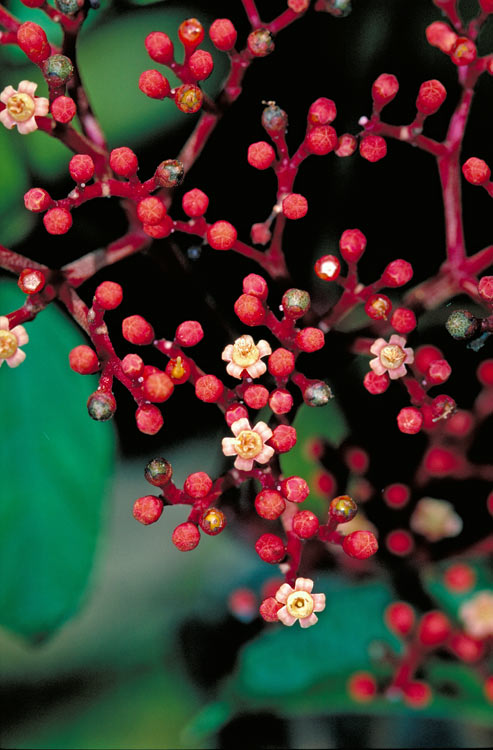
Flowers and buds

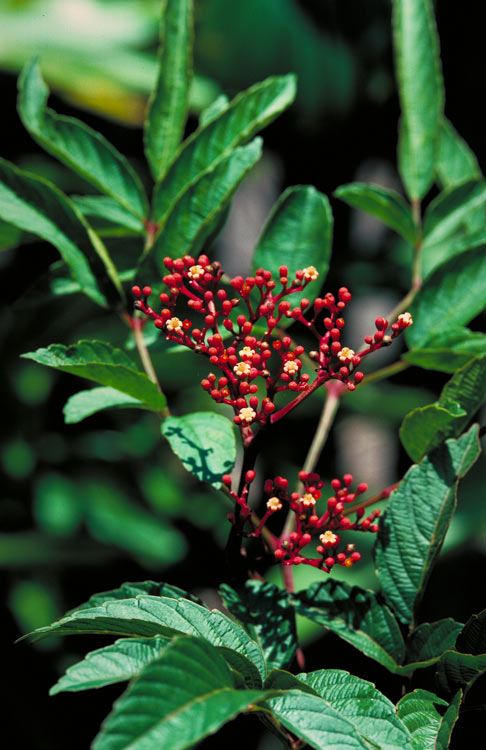
Foliage and flowers

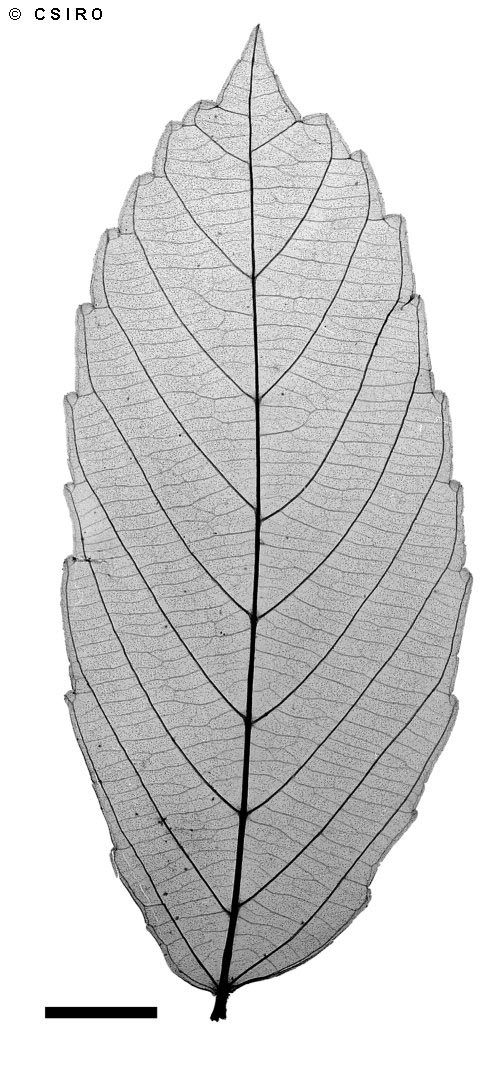
X-ray of leaf
