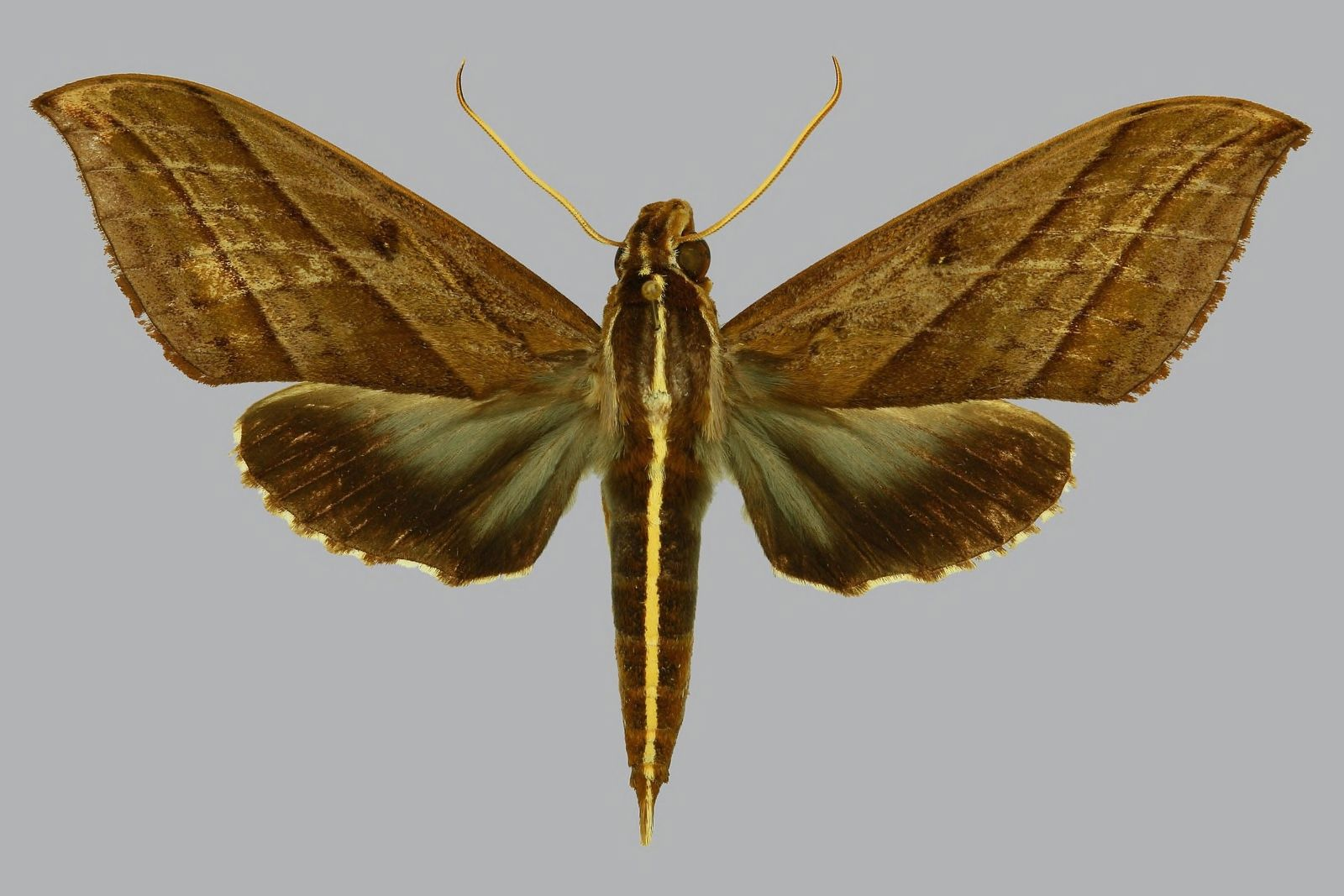

Scientific classification
- Domain: Eukaryota
- Kingdom: Animalia
- Phylum: Arthropoda
- Class: Insecta
- Order: Lepidoptera
- Family: Sphingidae
- Genus: Elibia
- Species: E. linigera

Binomial name
- Elibia linigera Boisduval, 1875

= Elibia linigera =

Species of moth

Elibia linigera is a moth of the family Sphingidae . It is known from the Philippines.
