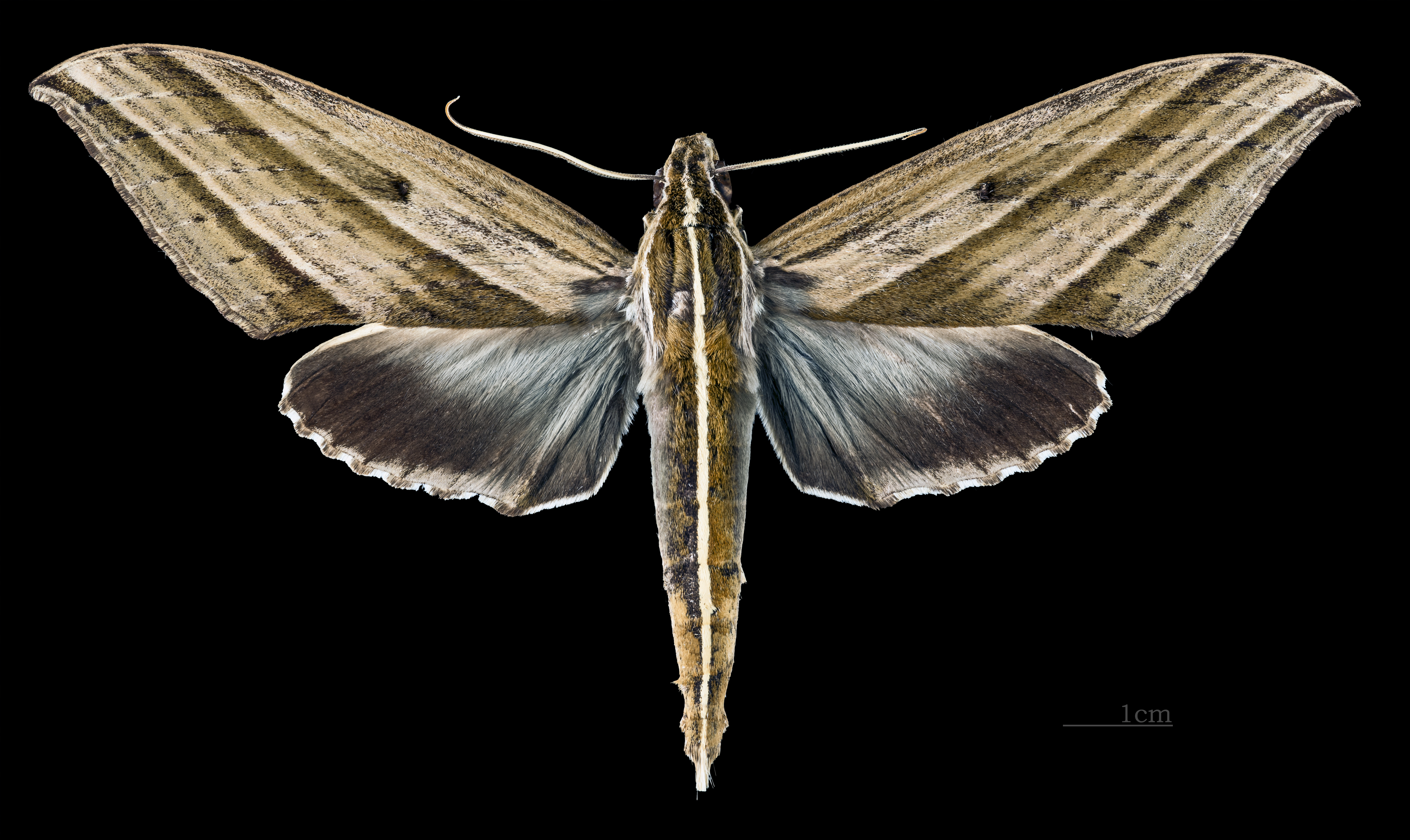
- Elibia dolichus

Scientific classification
- Domain: Eukaryota
- Kingdom: Animalia
- Phylum: Arthropoda
- Class: Insecta
- Order: Lepidoptera
- Family: Sphingidae
- Subtribe: Macroglossina
- Genus: Elibia; Walker, 1856

= Elibia =

Genus of moths

Elibia is a genus of moths in the family Sphingidae. The genus was erected by Francis Walker in 1856.

== Species ==
- Elibia dolichus (Westwood, 1847)
- Elibia linigera Boisduval, 1875
