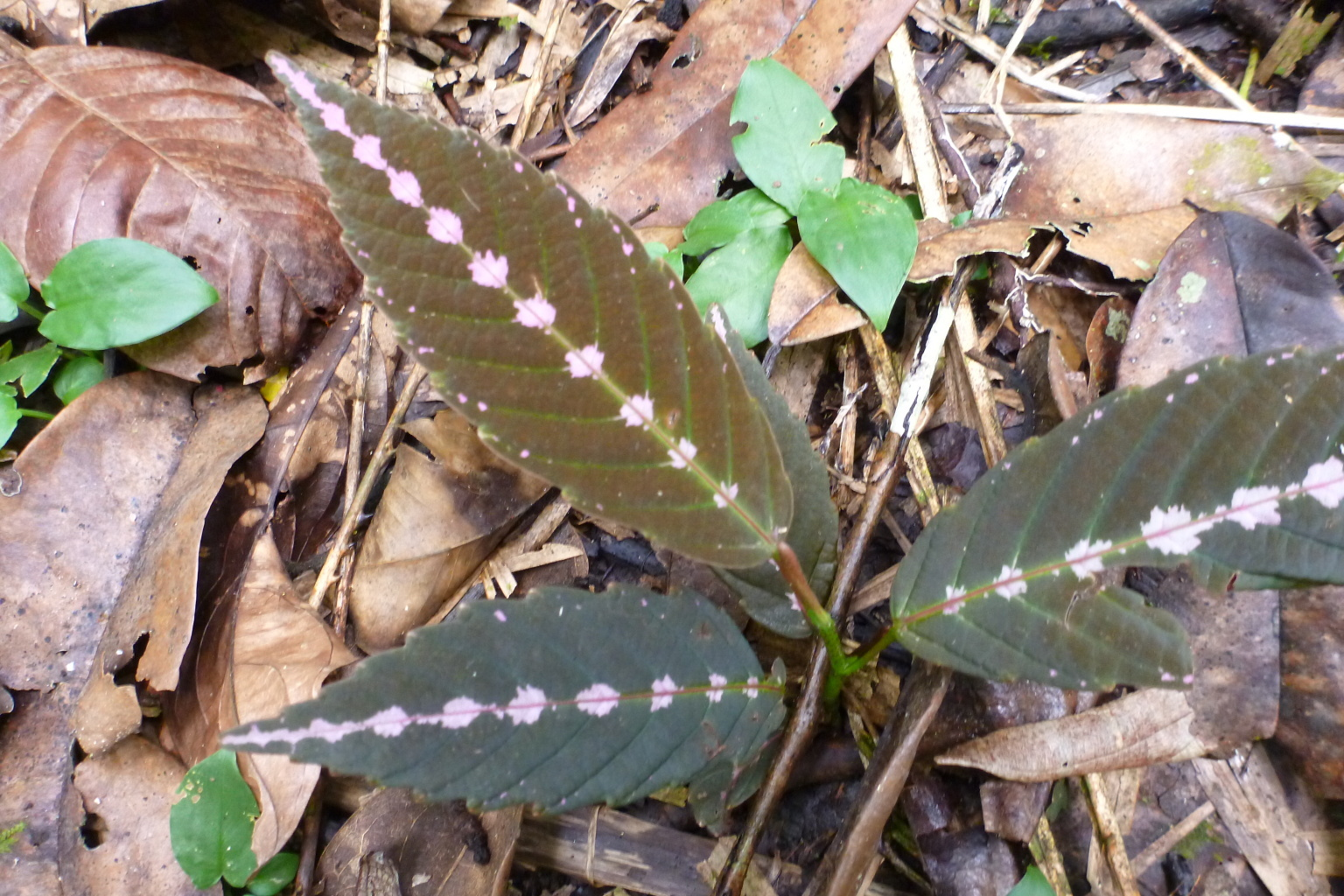
- L. rubra Blume, formerly L. sambucina Blanco

Scientific classification
- Kingdom: Plantae
- Clade: Tracheophytes
- Clade: Angiosperms
- Clade: Eudicots
- Clade: Rosids
- Order: Vitales
- Family: Vitaceae
- Subfamily: Leeoideae; Burmeist.
- Genus: Leea; D.Royen

Type species
- Leea aequata L.

Species
- see text

= Leea =

Genus of plants in the family Vitaceae

Leea is a genus of plants in the family Vitaceae, subfamily Leeoideae, that are native to parts of central Africa, tropical Asia, Australia and Melanesia.

== Description ==
Plants in this genus are shrubs or small trees. Leaves are arranged alternately on either side of the branches, and are compound (i.e divided into leaflets). Stipules are characteristic. Inflorescences are cymose, flowers have four or five petals and sepals. The fruits are berries containing up to six (rarely 10) seeds.

Unlike the rest of the Vitaceae species, they are not climbers and do not have tendrils.

== Taxonomy ==
It was previously placed in its own family, Leeaceae, based on morphological differences between it and other Vitaceae genera. These differences include ovule number per locule (two in Vitaceae and one in Leeaceae), carpel number (two in Vitaceae and three in Leeaceae), and the absence or presence of a staminoidal tube (present in Leeaceae) and floral disc (present in Vitaceae). Pollen structure has also been examined for taxonomic demarcation, although a 1968 study of pollen morphology by Ion Teofil Tarnavschi and E. Petria concluded that Leeaceae and Vitaceae should remain separate families, while a 1966 study by Otto Gunnar Elias Erdtman concluded that Leea should be included in Vitaceae.

=== Etymology ===
The genus was named by Carl Linnaeus after James Lee, the Scottish nurseryman based in Hammersmith, London who introduced many new plant discoveries to England at the end of the 18th century.

== Distribution ==
It is native to areas from Africa, through south and eastern Asia to Australia and the western Pacific. The World Geographical Scheme for Recording Plant Distributions lists the countries/regions as follows:

- Northeast Tropical Africa: Sudan
- South Tropical Africa: Angola, Malawi, Zambia
- East Tropical Africa: Kenya, Tanzania, Uganda
- West Tropical Africa: Benin, Burkina, Ghana, Guinea, Guinea-Bissau, Ivory Coast, Liberia, Mali, Nigeria, Senegal, Sierra Leone, Togo
- West-Central Tropical Africa: Burundi, Cameroon, Central African Republic, Congo, Gabon, Gulf of Guinea Islands
- Western Indian Ocean: Comoros, Madagascar, Mauritius, Réunion
- China: China South-Central, China Southeast, Tibet
- Eastern Asia: Hainan, Taiwan
- Indian subcontinent: Assam, Bangladesh, East Himalaya, India, Laccadive Islands, Nepal, Pakistan, Sri Lanka, West Himalaya
- Indo-China: Andaman Islands, Cambodia, Laos, Myanmar, Nicobar Islands, Thailand, Vietnam
- Malesia: Borneo, Jawa, Lesser Sunda Islands, Malaya, Maluku, Philippines, Sulawesi, Sumatera, Christmas Islands
- Papuasia: Bismarck Archipelago, New Guinea, Solomon Islands
- Australia: Northern Territory, Queensland
- Southwestern Pacific: Fiji, Santa Cruz Islands, Vanuatu
- Northwestern Pacific: Caroline Islands

== Ecology ==
Leea flowers are visited by a variety of potential insect pollinators, including flies, wasps, bees, butterflies, and beetles. Some species may have evolved synchronized dichogamy as a mechanism to prevent self pollination.

== Gallery ==
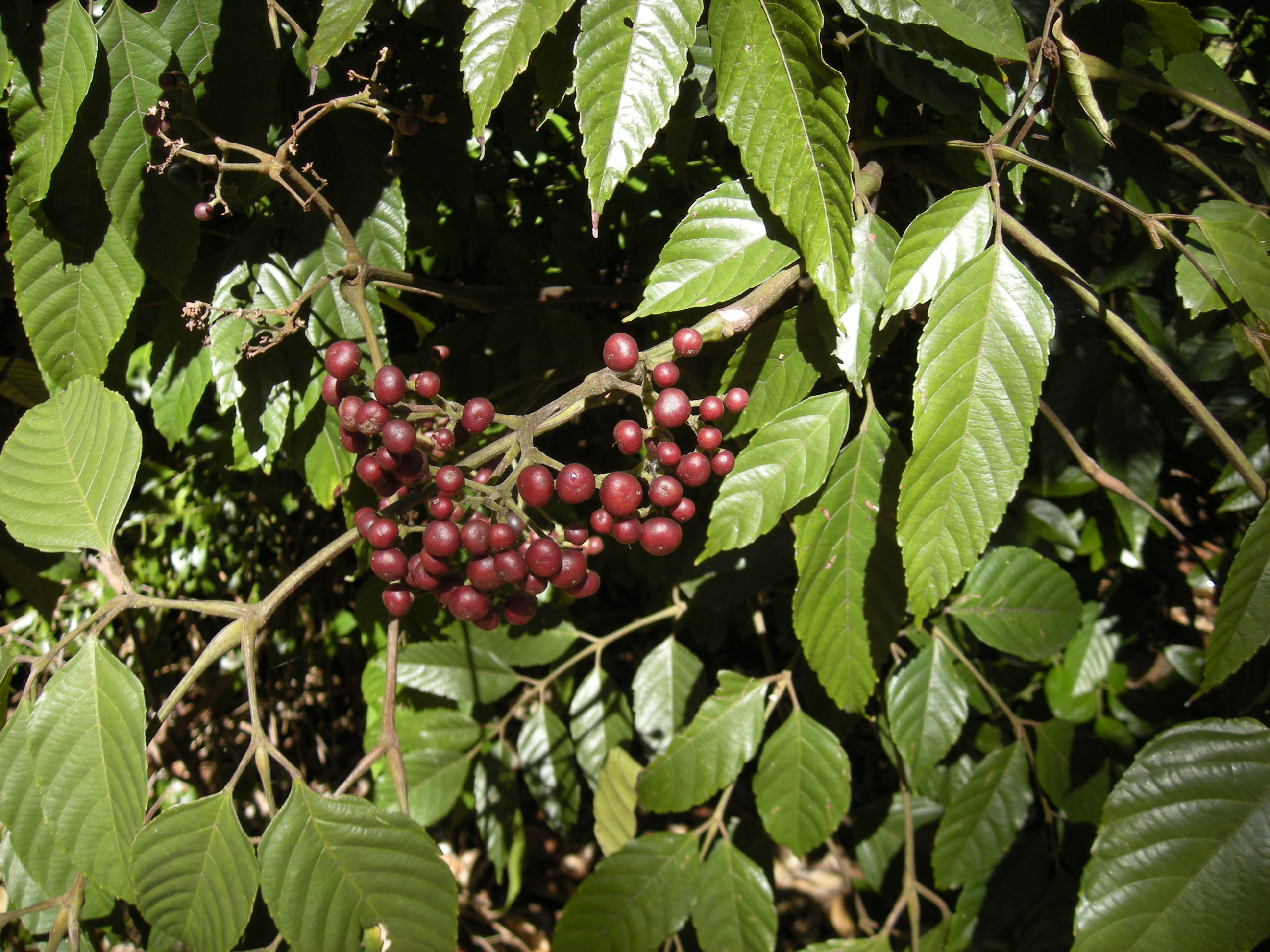
L. indica

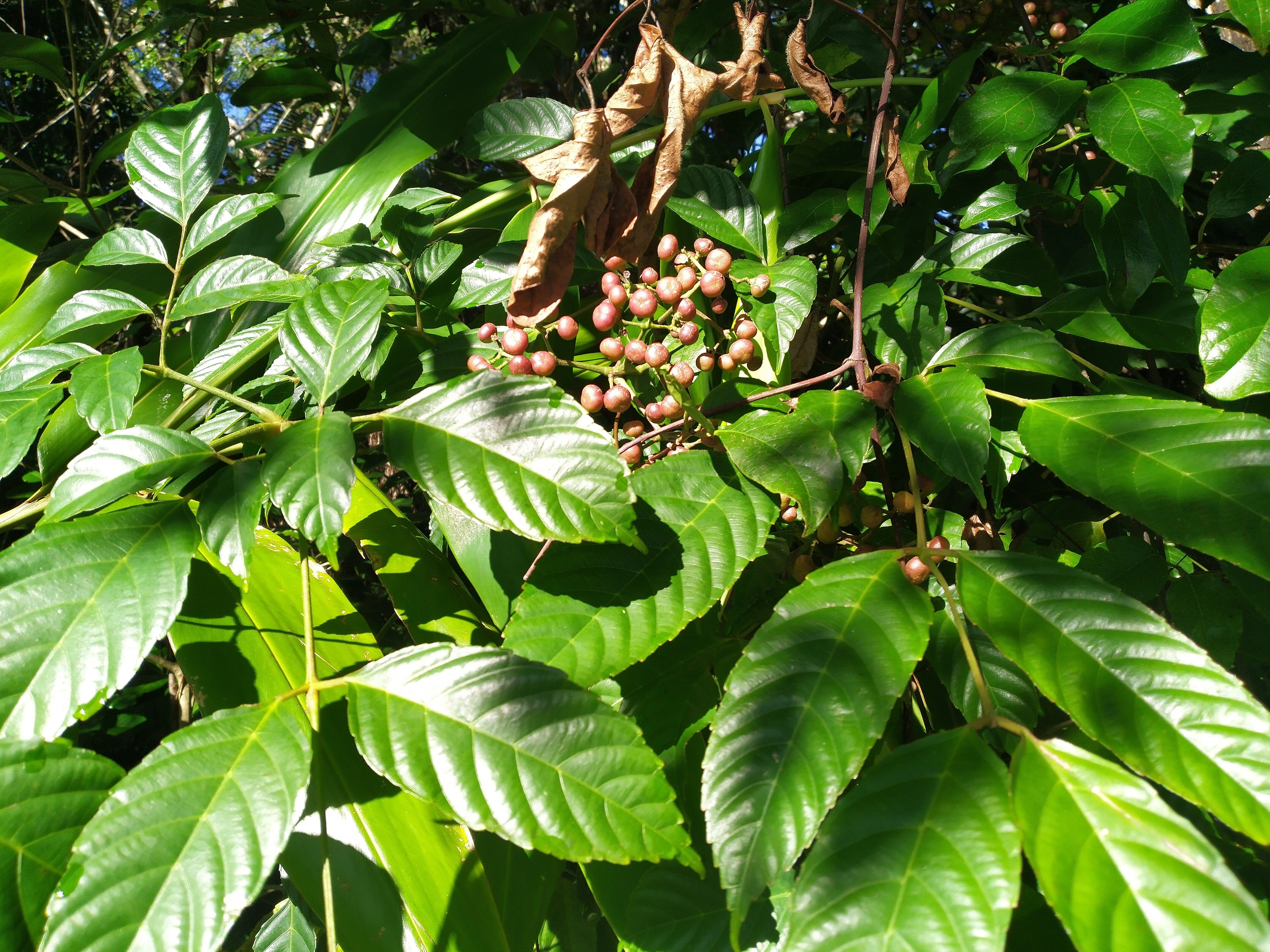
L. nova-guineensis

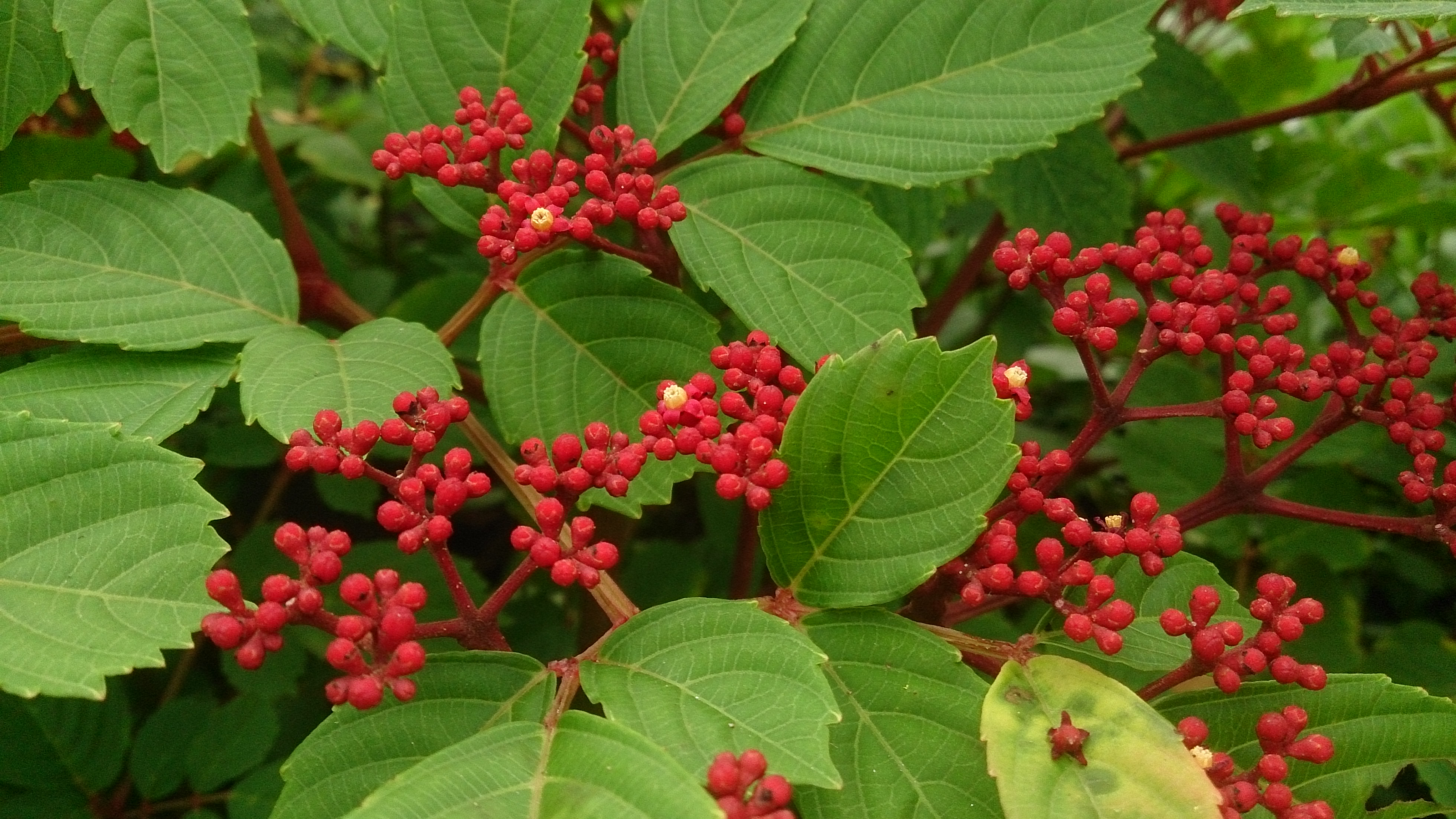
L. rubra

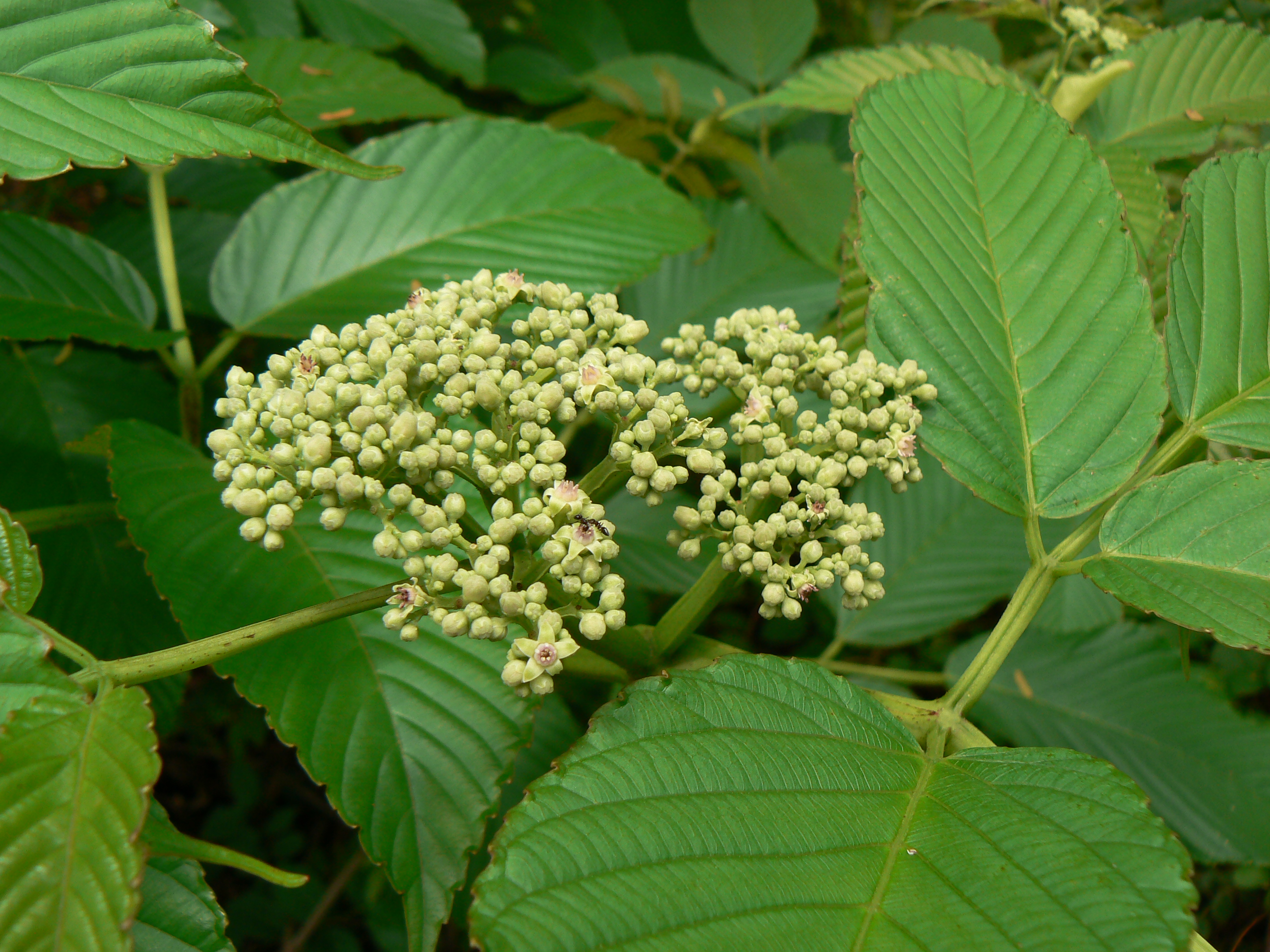
L. asiatica

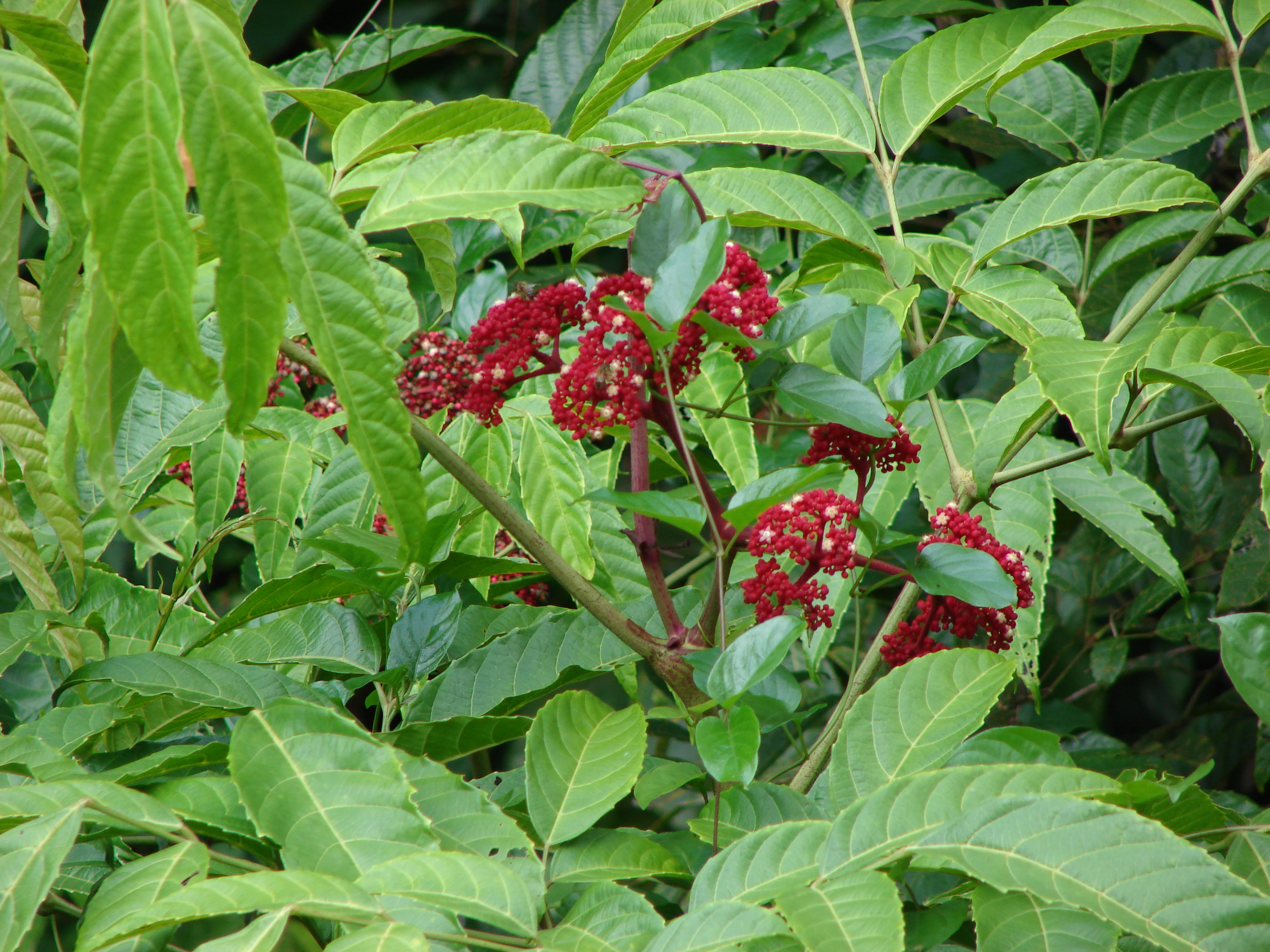
L. philippinensis

== Species ==
Plants of the World Online accepts the following 45 species in this genus as of 2 November 2025.

- Leea aculeata Blume ex Spreng.
- Leea acuminatissima Merr.
- Leea adwivedica K.Kumar
- Leea aequata L.
- Leea alata Edgew.
- Leea amabilis H.J.Veitch
- Leea angulata Korth. ex Miq.
- Leea asiatica (L.) Ridsdale
- Leea coccinea Planch.
- Leea compactiflora Kurz
- Leea congesta Elmer
- Leea coryphantha Lauterb.
- Leea curtisii King
- Leea cuspidifera Baker
- Leea dentata Craib
- Leea glabra C.L.Li
- Leea gonioptera Lauterb.
- Leea grandifolia Kurz
- Leea guineensis G.Don
- Leea heterodoxa K.Schum. & Lauterb.
- Leea indica (Burm.f.) Merr.
- Leea javanica Blume
- Leea krukoffiana Ridsdale
- Leea longifoliola Merr.
- Leea macrophylla Roxb. ex Hornem.
- Leea macropus Lauterb. & K.Schum.
- Leea magnifolia Merr.
- Leea manillensis Walp.
- Leea nova-guineensis Valeton
- Leea papuana Merr. & L.M.Perry
- Leea philippinensis Merr.
- Leea quadrifida Merr.
- Leea rubra Blume
- Leea saxatilis Ridl.
- Leea setuligera C.B.Clarke
- Leea simplicifolia Zoll. & Moritzi
- Leea smithii Koord.
- Leea spinea Desc.
- Leea suaveolens Merr. & L.M.Perry
- Leea tetramera B.L.Burtt
- Leea thorelii Gagnep.
- Leea tinctoria Lindl. ex Baker
- Leea tuberculosemen C.B.Clarke
- Leea unifoliolata Merr.
- Leea zippeliana Miq.
