= Hieronymus van der Mij =

Dutch painter

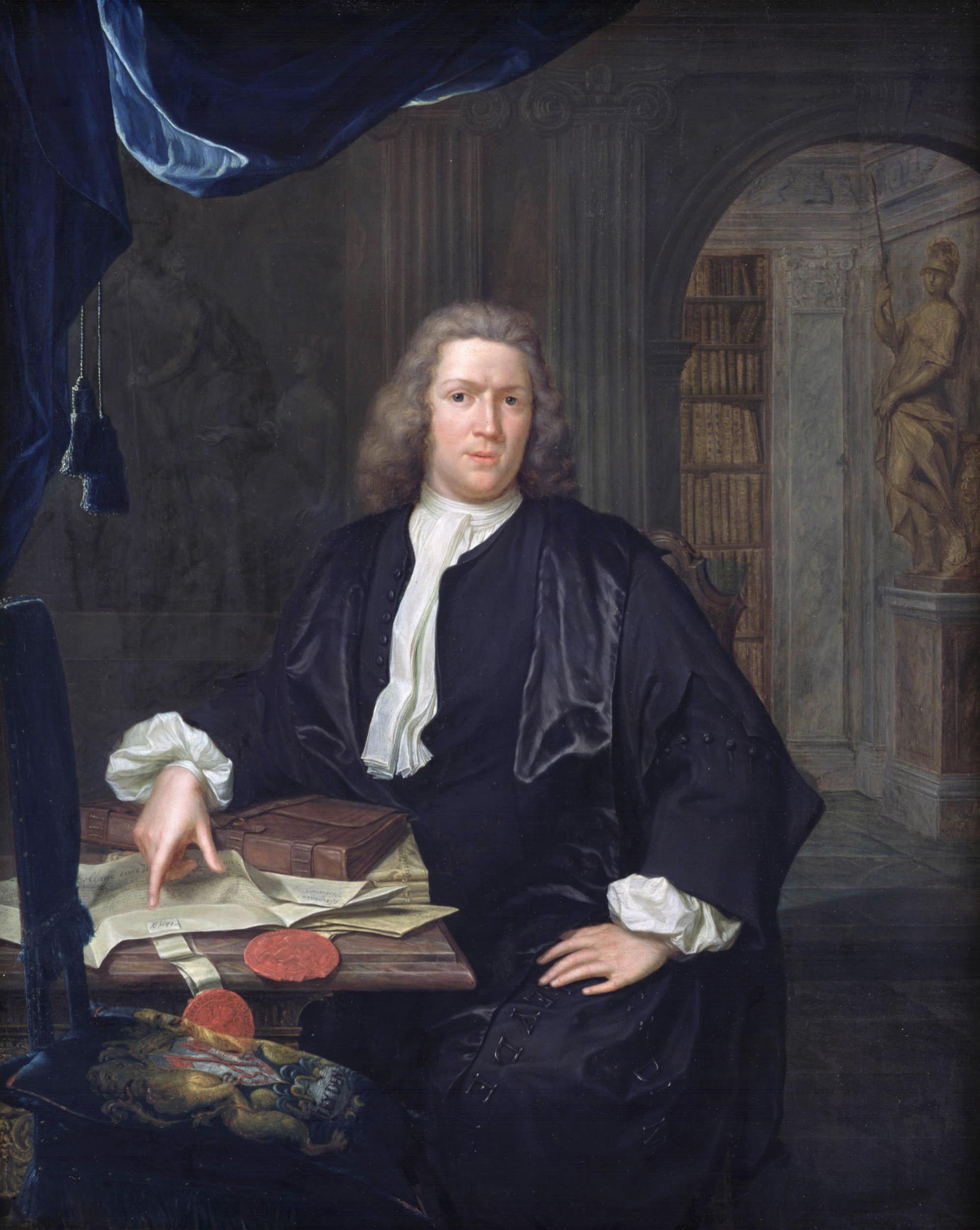
Portrait of David van Royen, by Hieronymus van der Mij

Hieronymus van der Mij (1687–1761) was an 18th-century portrait painter from the Dutch Republic.

He was born in Leiden and was a pupil of Willem van Mieris. He became a teacher and later director of the Leidse Tekenacademie, where his pupils were Pieter Catel, Johannes le Francq van Berkhey, Nicolaas Reyers, Nicolaas Rijnenburg, and Hendrik van Velthoven. He died in Leiden.
