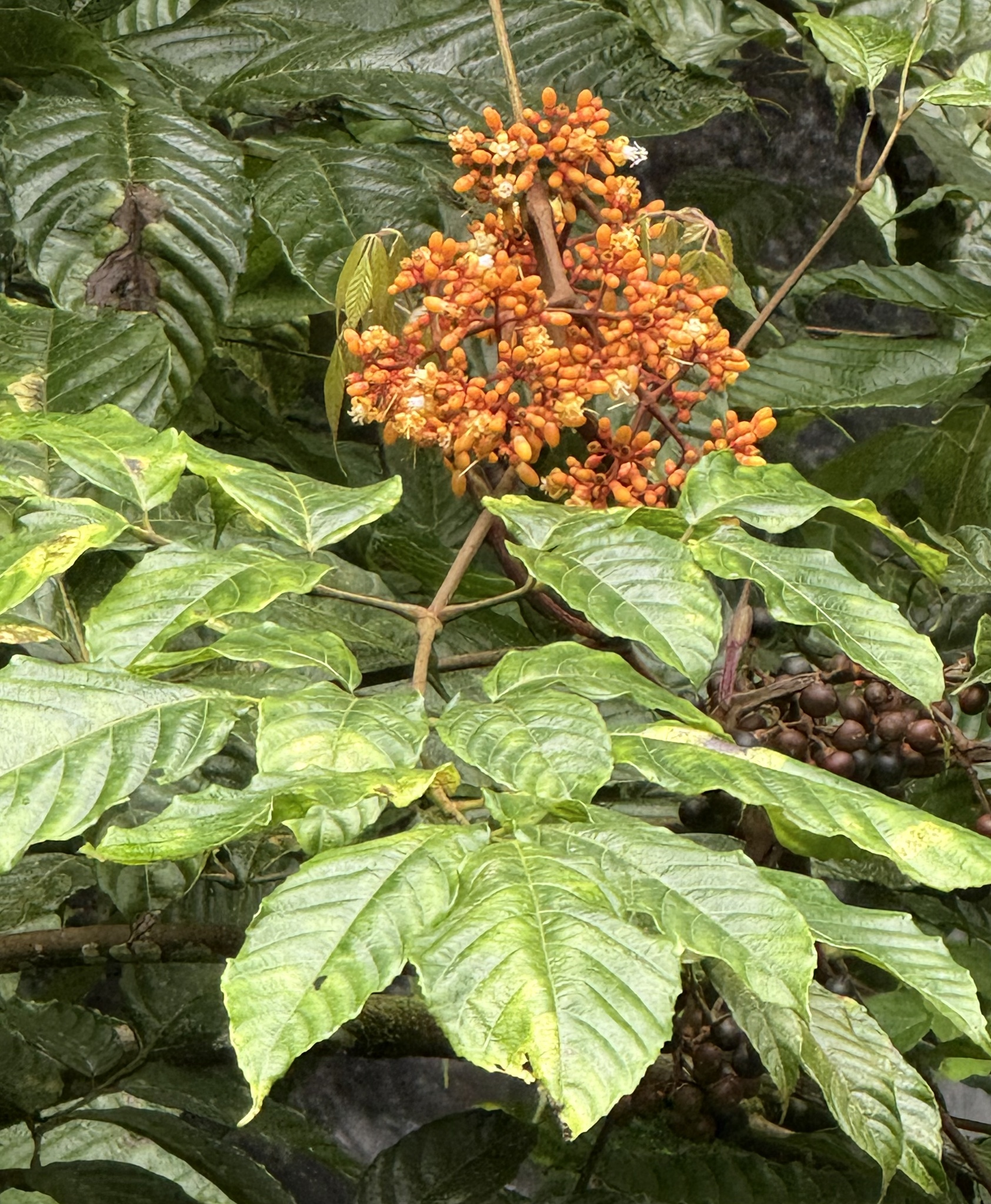

Conservation status
- Near Threatened (IUCN 2.3)

Scientific classification
- Kingdom: Plantae
- Clade: Tracheophytes
- Clade: Angiosperms
- Clade: Eudicots
- Clade: Rosids
- Order: Vitales
- Family: Vitaceae
- Genus: Leea
- Species: L. tinctoria

Binomial name
- Leea tinctoria Baker

= Leea tinctoria =

Species of vine

Leea tinctoria is a species of plant in the family Vitaceae. It is endemic to São Tomé Island. It is an important nectar source for the bird Nectarinia newtonii (Newton's yellow-breasted sunbird). It has orange flowers.
