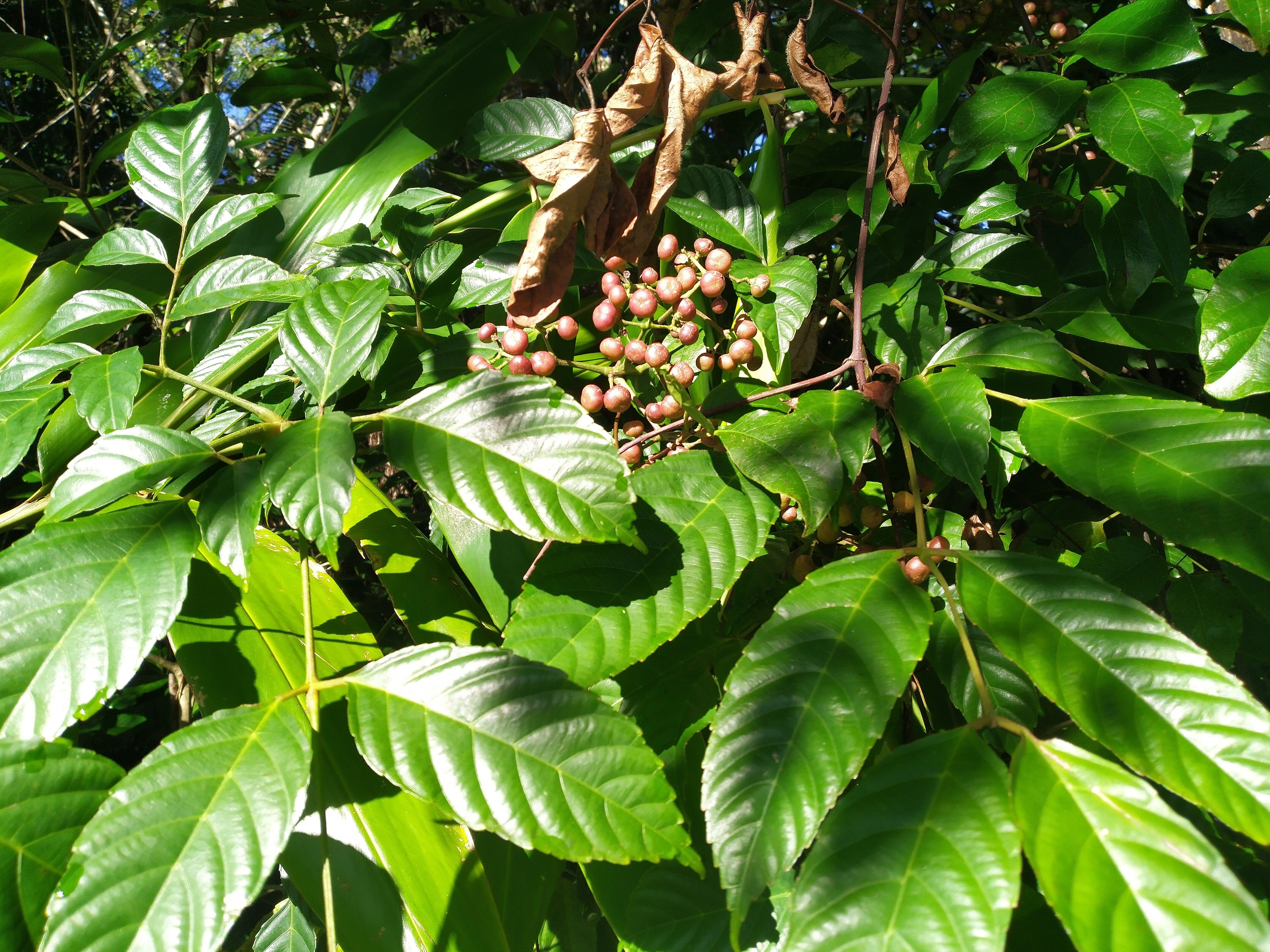
- Foliage and fruit, Cairns, Queensland

Conservation status
- Least Concern (NCA)

Scientific classification
- Kingdom: Plantae
- Clade: Embryophytes
- Clade: Tracheophytes
- Clade: Spermatophytes
- Clade: Angiosperms
- Clade: Eudicots
- Clade: Rosids
- Order: Vitales
- Family: Vitaceae
- Genus: Leea
- Species: L. nova-guineensis

Binomial name
- Leea nova-guineensis Valeton

Synonyms
- Leea gracilis Lauterb.

= Leea nova-guineensis =

Bandicoot berry

Species of flowering plant

Leea nova-guineensis, commonly known as bandicoot berry, is a plant in the family Vitaceae native to parts of Malesia and Oceania.

== Description ==
The bandicoot berry is an evergreen shrub which usually grows to about 4 m (13 ft) high, but can occasionally be taller. It is a multistemmed plant with large tripinnate leaves measuring up to 1 m (3 ft 3 in) long, while the individual leaflets measure up to 21 cm (8.3 in) long by 9 cm (3.5 in) wide. The stipules are quite large and may be up to 6 cm (2.4 in) long. Flowers are produced in either terminal or leaf-opposed panicles. They are quite small, around 3 mm (0.12 in) long, with five green or cream petals. The fruit is a red, purple or black berry up to 15 mm (0.59 in) diameter.

== Taxonomy ==
This plant was originally considered to be part of a very widespread population of Leea indica, however in 1907 the Dutch botanist Theodoric Valeton published a paper in which the plants of Malesia, Australia and the southwest Pacific were renamed as Leea nova-guineensis. Much later, in 2012, a paper was published in which this species was given the new combination Leea novoguineensis, which is recognised by Australian authorities, but not by Plants of the World Online.

== Distribution and ecology ==
Leea nova-guineensis grows as an understory plant in rainforest, at elevations from sea level to 400 m (1,300 ft). It is native to the Lesser Sunda Islands, the Maluku Islands, New Guinea, the Bismark Archipelago, the Santa Cruz Islands, the Solomon Islands, Vanuatu, and the states of the Northern Territory and Queensland in Australia.

The fruit are reported as being eaten by wompoo fruit doves.

== Conservation ==
This species is listed by the Queensland Department of Environment and Science as least concern. As of 9 July 2023, it has not been assessed by the International Union for Conservation of Nature (IUCN).

== Gallery ==
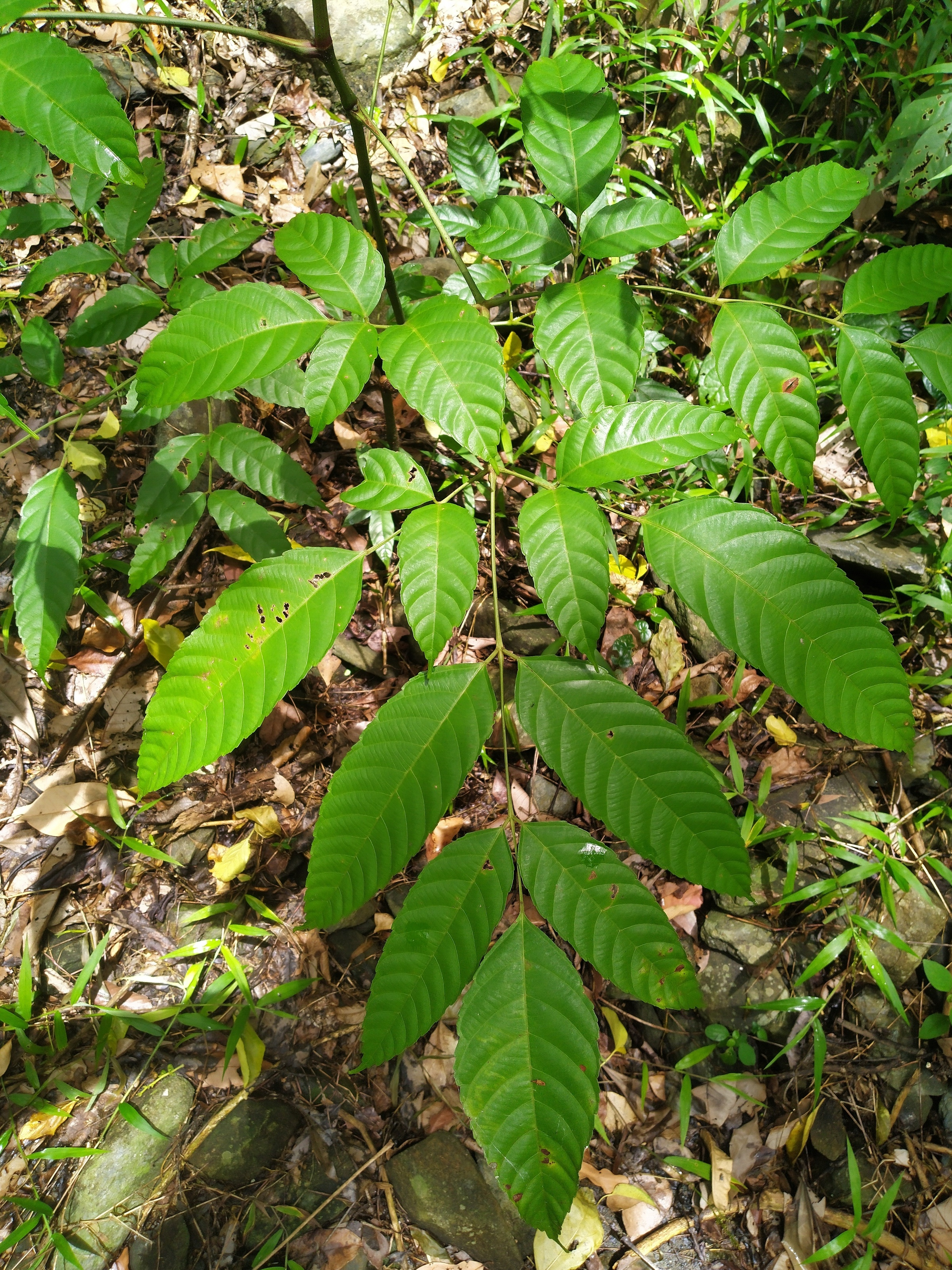
Tripinnate leaf

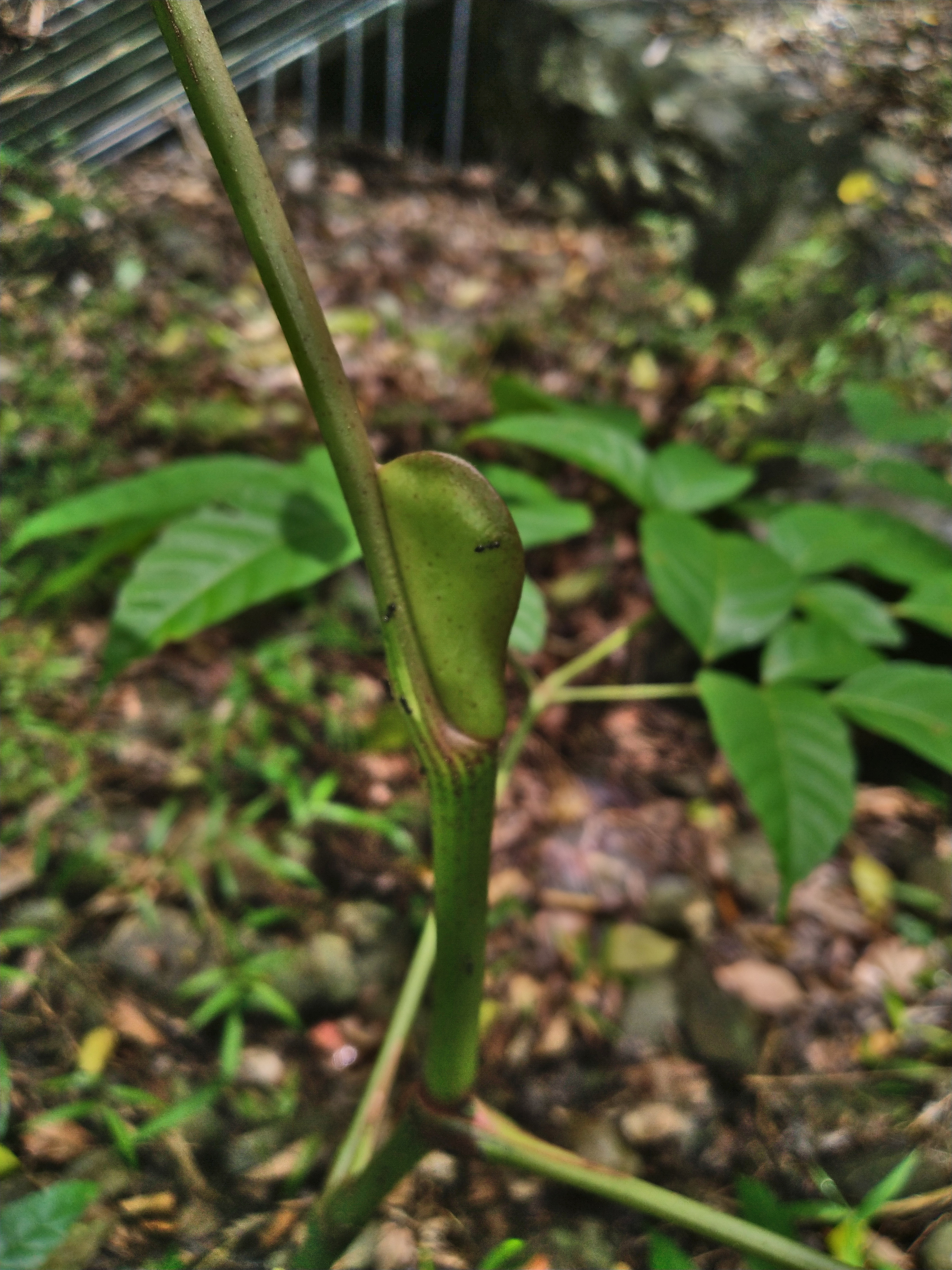
Large stipule

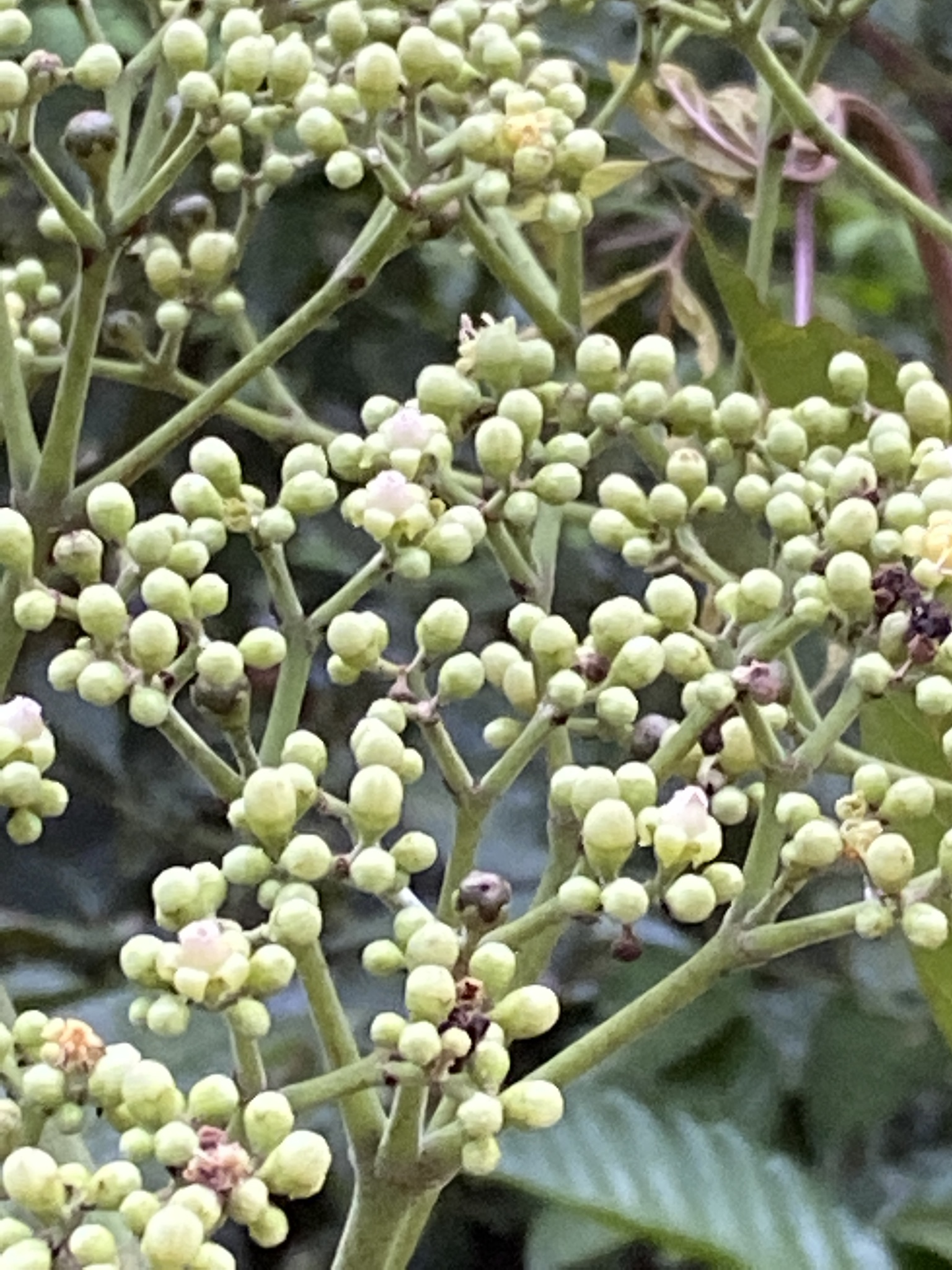
Inflorescence

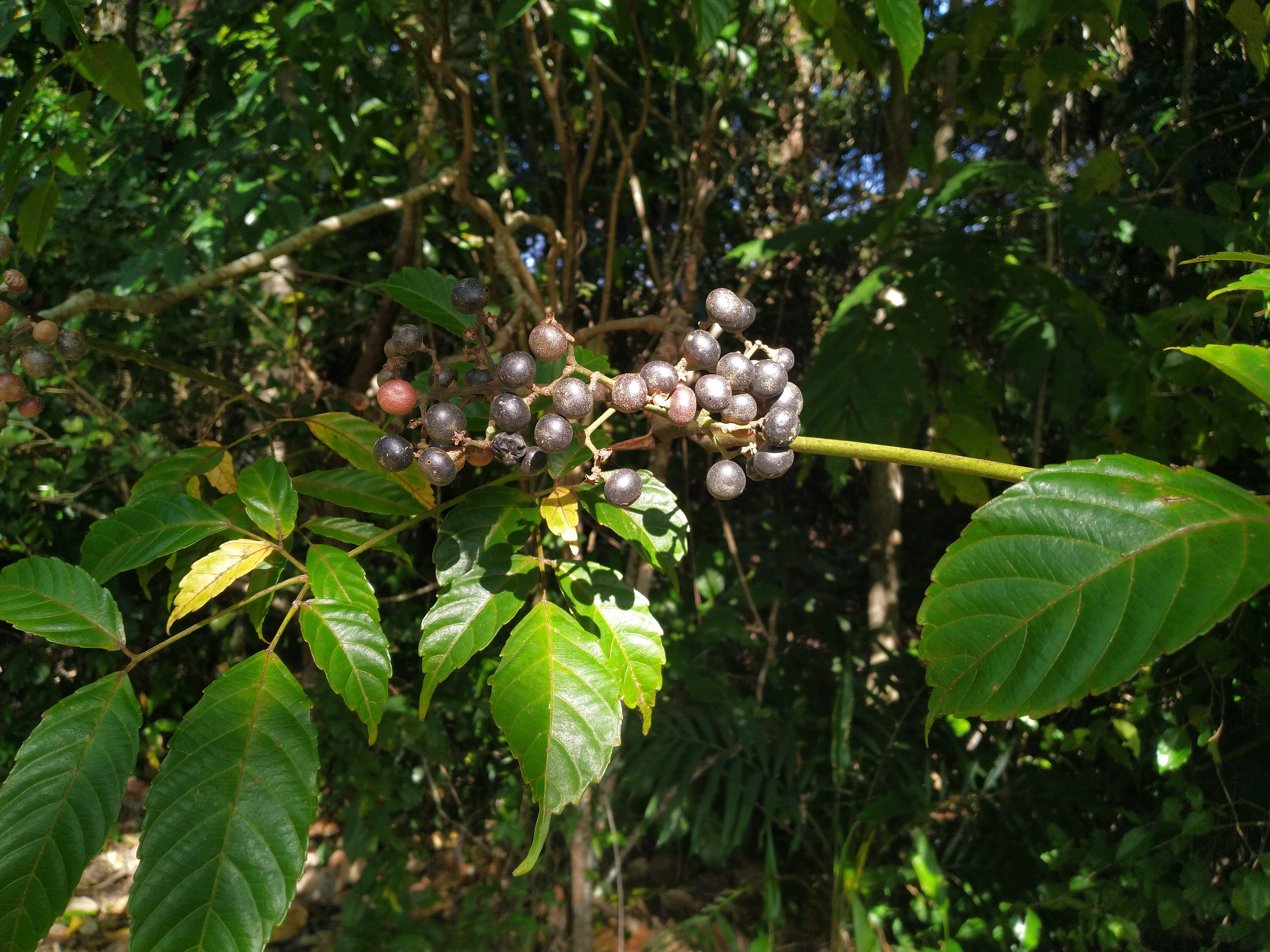
Ripening fruit

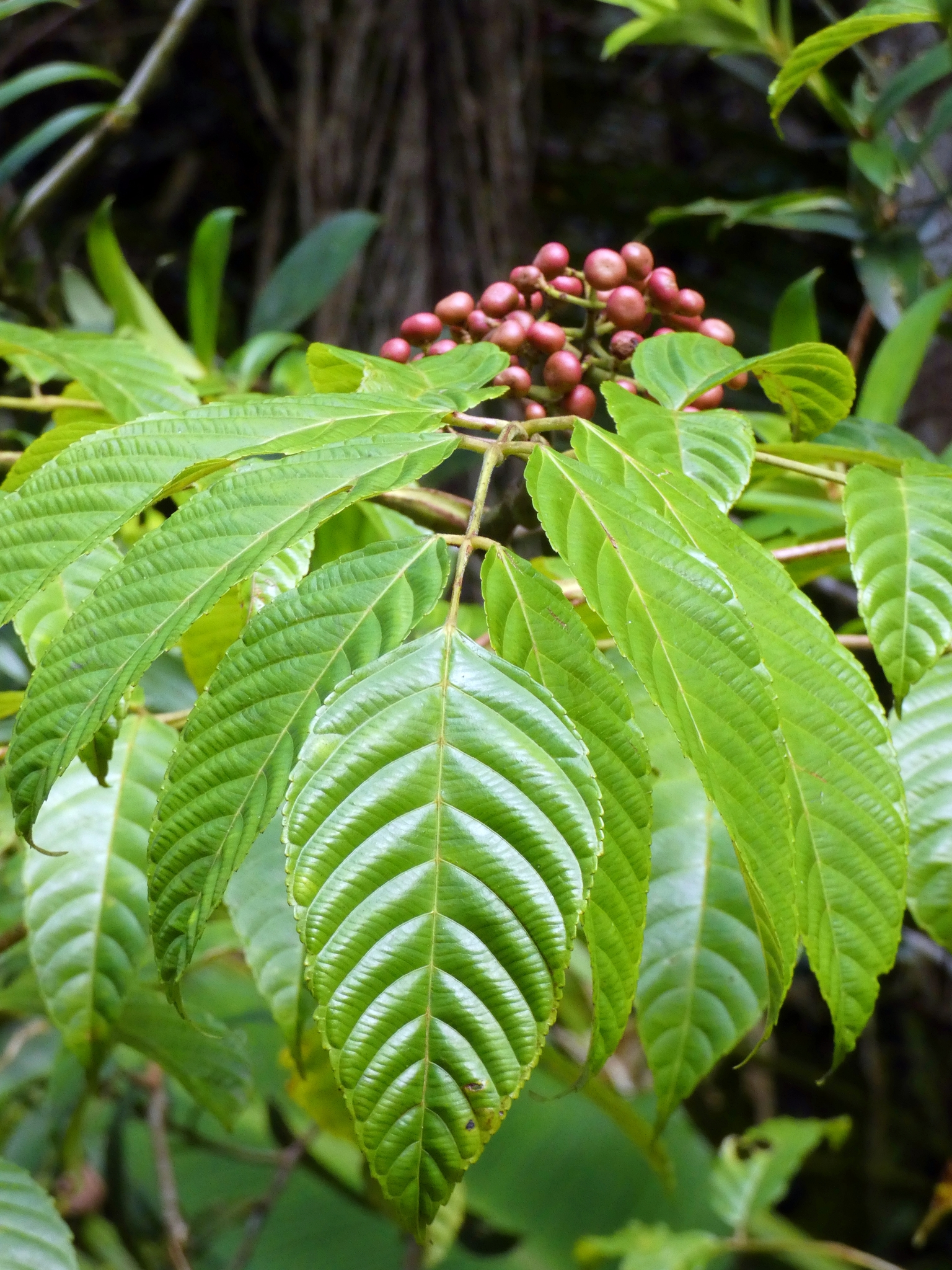
Fruit and foliage

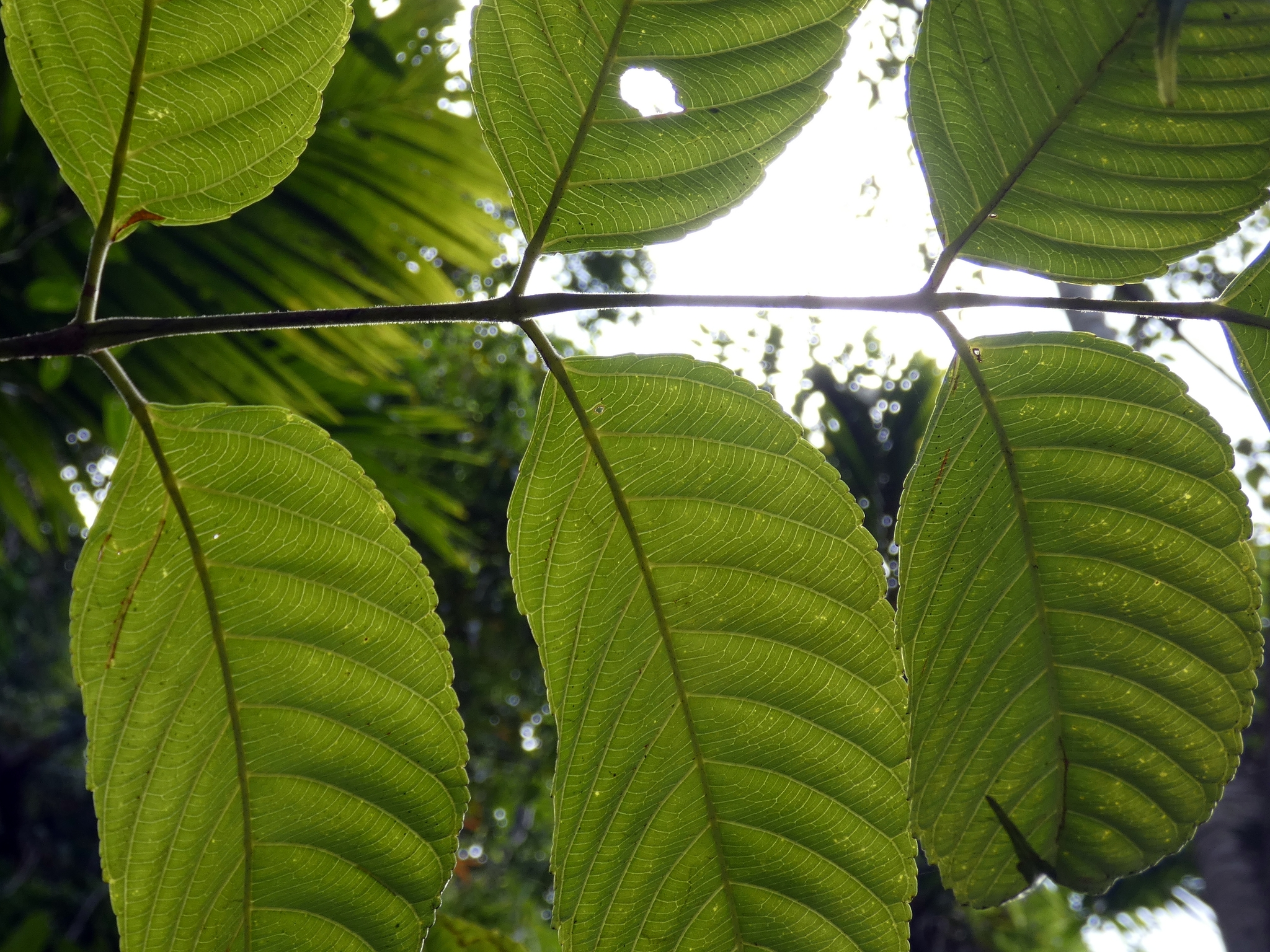
Leaf venation
