= David van Royen =

David van Royen (30 December 1727 – 29 April 1799) was a Dutch physician and botanist who worked at the Hortus Botanicus Leiden where he succeeded his uncle Adriaan van Royen (1704-1779) as director.

== Biography ==
Van Royen was born in an upper-class family in Leiden where his father David van Royen (1699–1764) was a well-known jurist, administrator and Leiden University librarian. He studied medicine and became a physician in 1752. He published a book, Oratio de hortis publicis præstantissimis scientiae botanicae adminiculis in 1754 and became a professor of botany and director of the Hortus Botanicus Leiden in the same year. He was elected to the Royal Society in 1752. He greatly added to the herbarium collections and the Van Royen Herbarium has been considered important for taxonomic purposes as it includes numerous types of biological species. He was a correspondent of Carl Linnaeus.
