= Eurypteryx dianae =

Scientific classification
- Kingdom: Animalia
- Phylum: Arthropoda
- Class: Insecta
- Order: Lepidoptera
- Family: Sphingidae
- Genus: Eurypteryx
- Species: E. dianae

Binomial name
- Eurypteryx dianae Brechlin, 2006

Species of moth

Eurypteryx dianae is a moth of the family Sphingidae which is known from Guangxi in China.

The length of the forewings is about 32 millimetres (1.3 in). It is similar to Eurypteryx geoffreyi.
