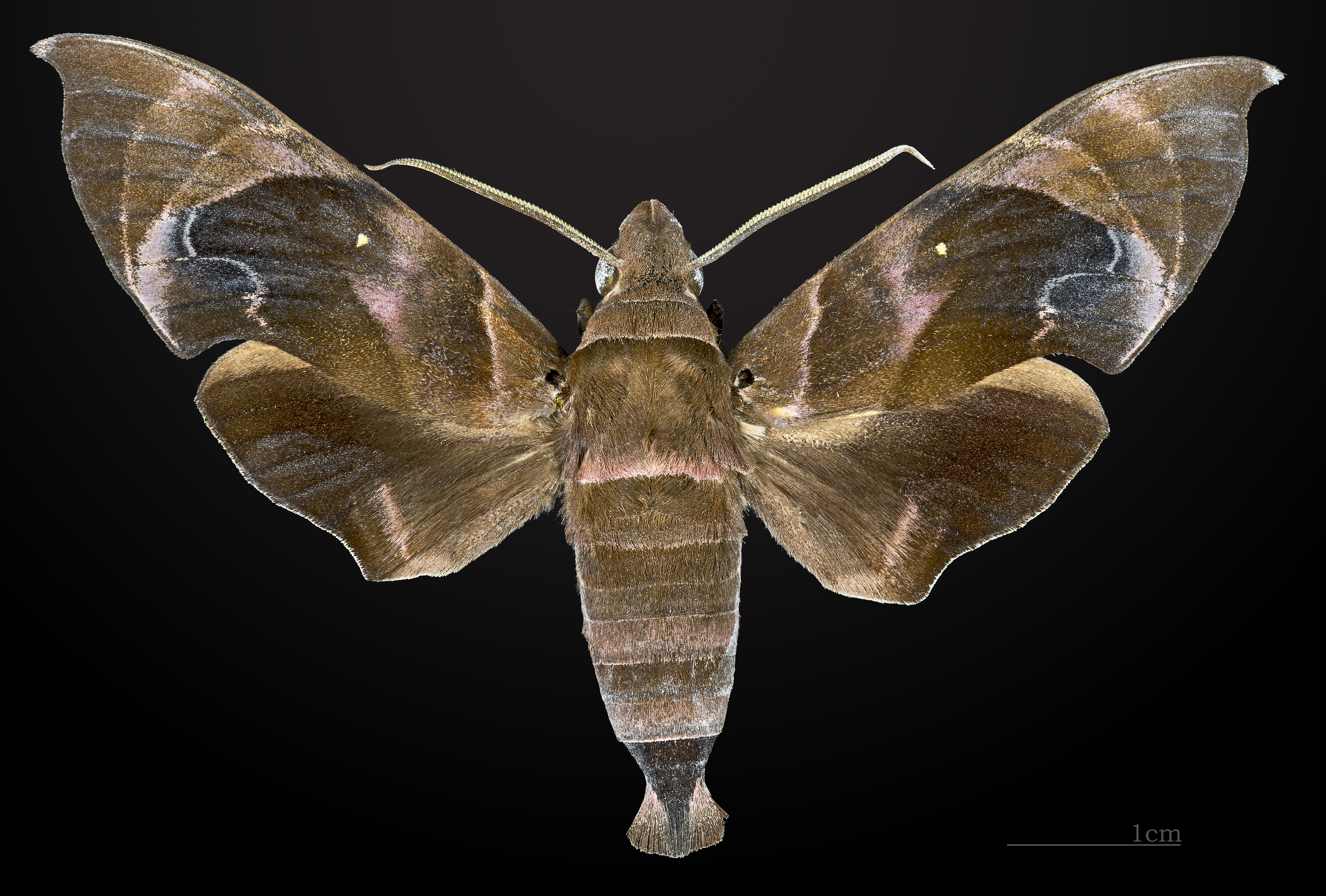
- Eurypteryx bhaga

Scientific classification
- Kingdom: Animalia
- Phylum: Arthropoda
- Class: Insecta
- Order: Lepidoptera
- Family: Sphingidae
- Subtribe: Macroglossina
- Genus: Eurypteryx; Felder, 1874

Species
- See text

Synonyms
- Indiana Tutt, 1903

= Eurypteryx =

Genus of moths

Eurypteryx is a genus of moths in the family Sphingidae.

== Species ==
- Eurypteryx alleni Hogenes & Treadaway, 1993
- Eurypteryx bhaga (Moore, 1866)
- Eurypteryx dianae Brechlin, 2006
- Eurypteryx falcata Gehlen, 1922
- Eurypteryx geoffreyi Cadiou & Kitching, 1990
- Eurypteryx molucca Felder, 1874
- Eurypteryx obtruncata Rothschild & Jordan, 1903
- Eurypteryx shelfordi Rothschild & Jordan, 1903
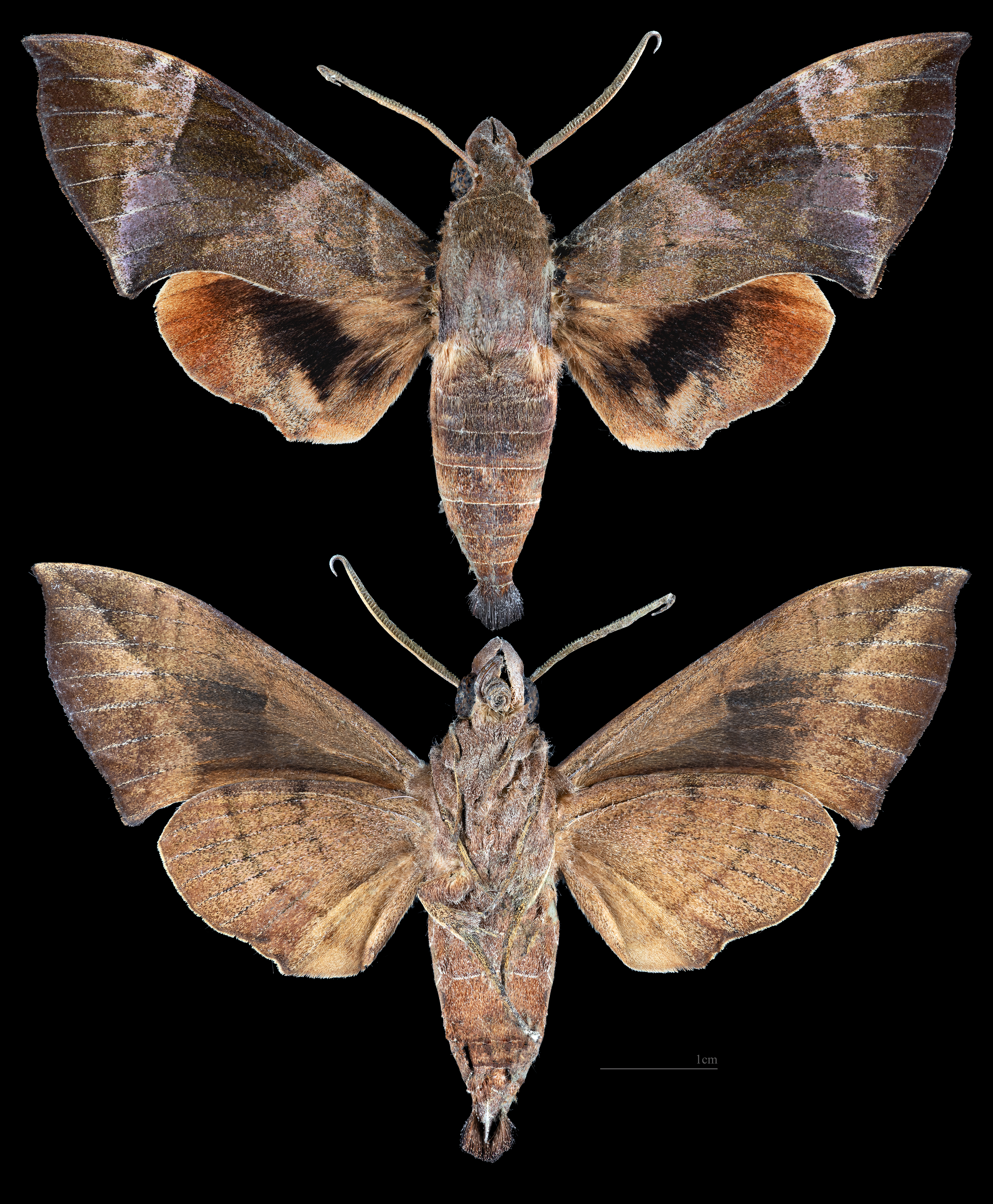
Eurypteryx alleni

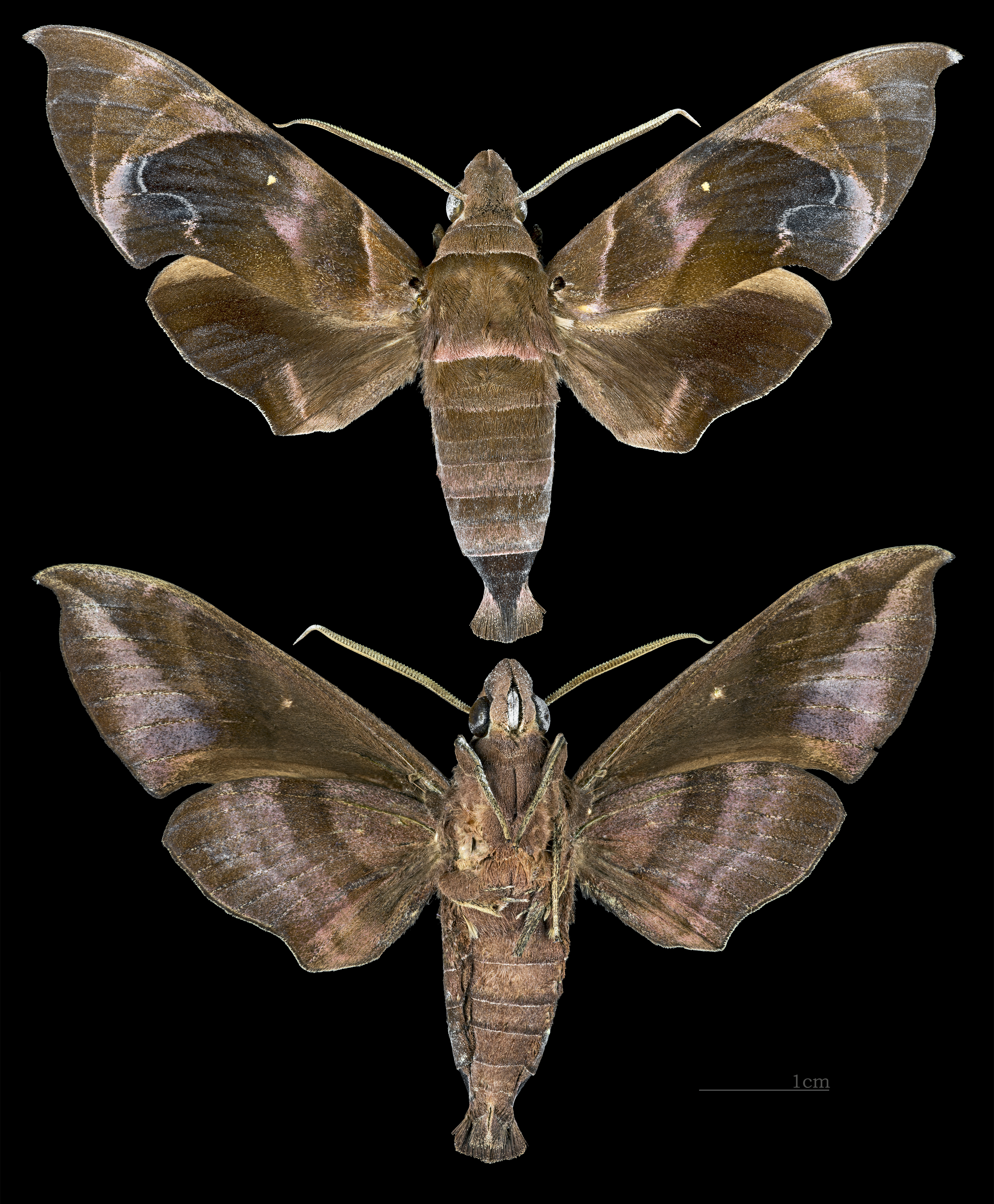
Eurypteryx bhaga

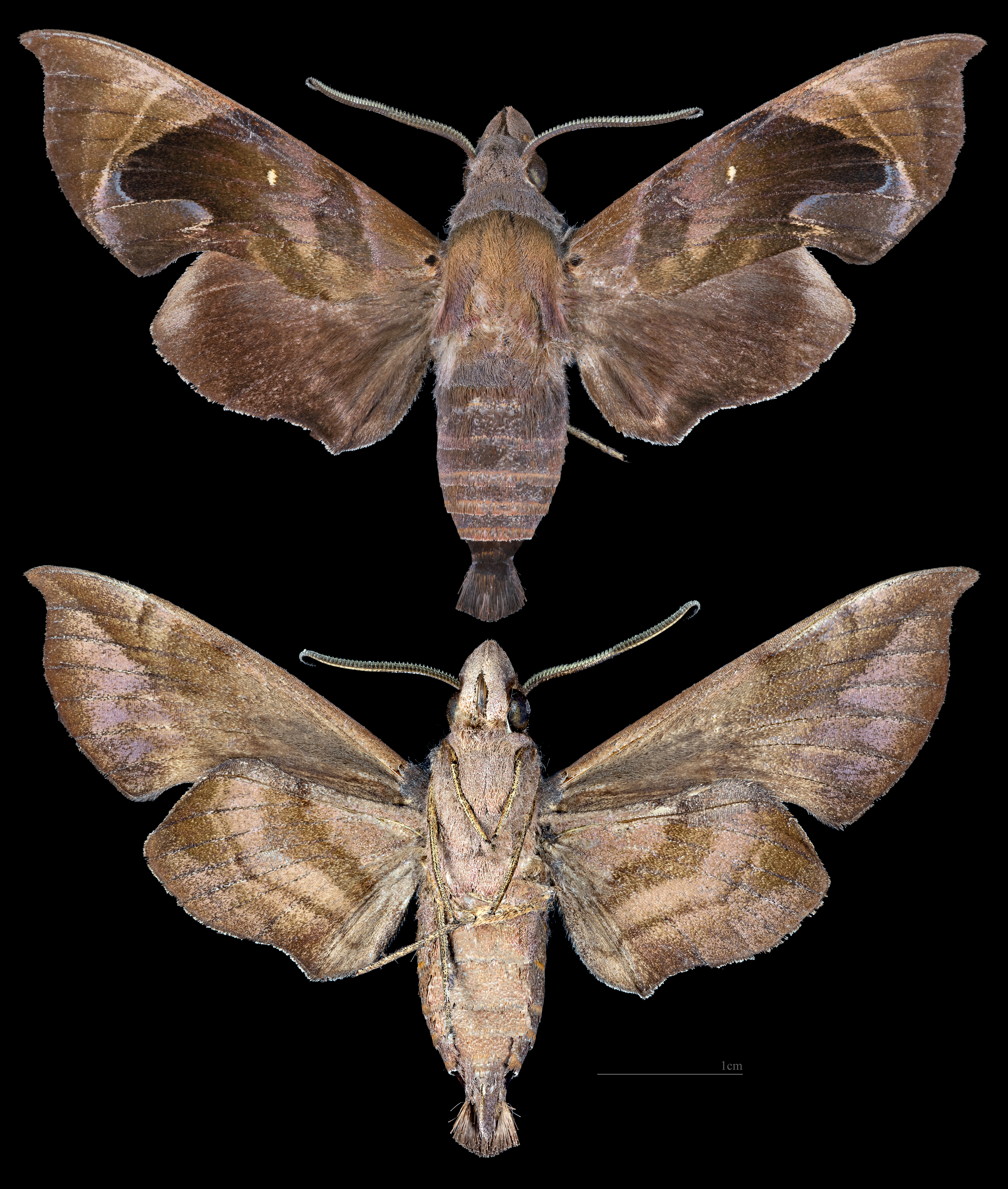
Eurypteryx obtruncata
