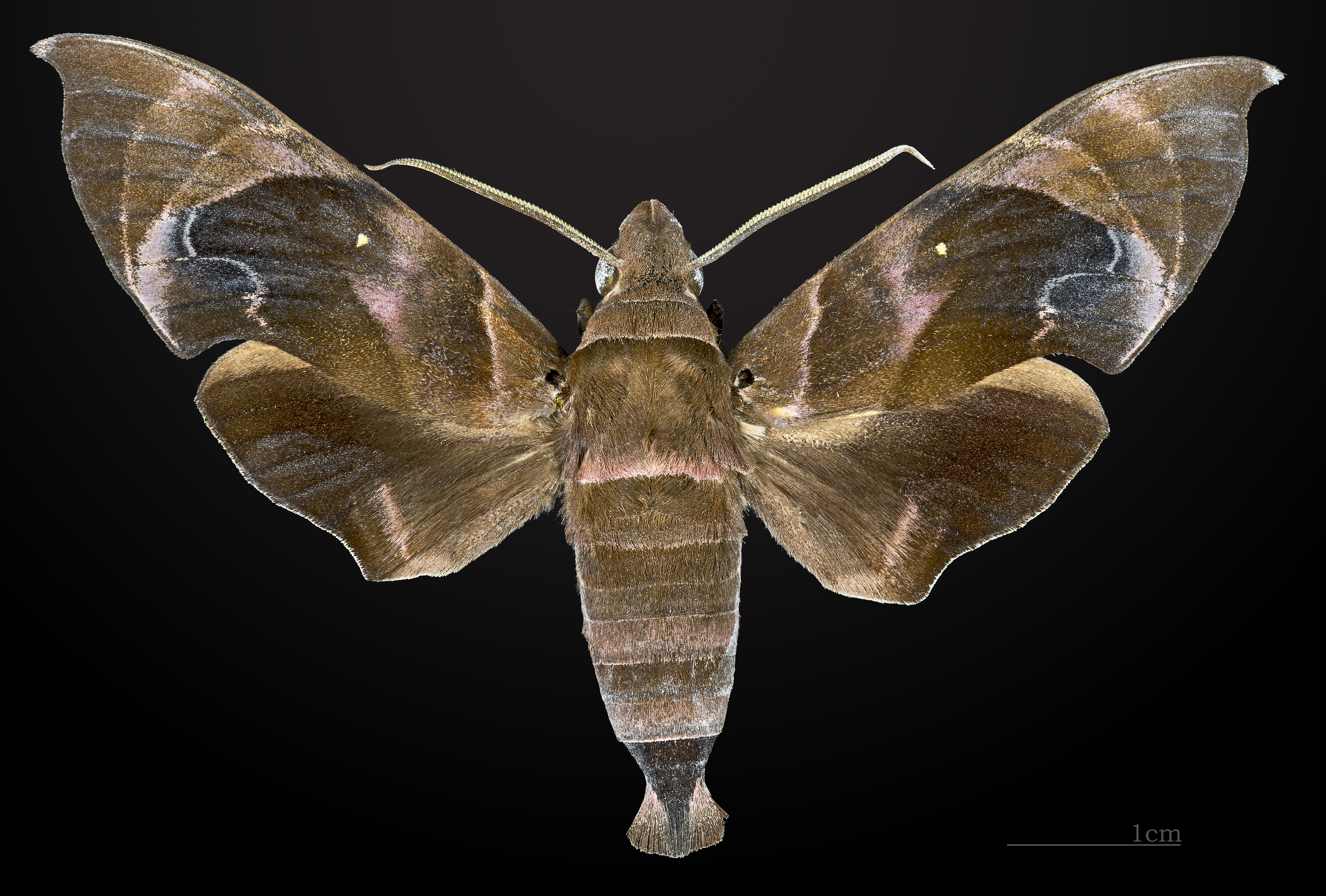

Scientific classification
- Kingdom: Animalia
- Phylum: Arthropoda
- Class: Insecta
- Order: Lepidoptera
- Family: Sphingidae
- Genus: Eurypteryx
- Species: E. bhaga

Binomial name
- Eurypteryx bhaga (Moore, 1866)

Synonyms
- Darapsa bhaga Moore, 1866

= Eurypteryx bhaga =

Species of moth

Eurypteryx bhaga, the hook-winged hawkmoth, is a moth of the family Sphingidae first described by Frederic Moore in 1866.

== Description ==
The wingspan is 82–84 mm. It is similar to Daphnis species, but easily distinguished by the falcate apex of the forewing, which also lacks a large oval dark green basal patch on the upperside. It is also similar to Eurypteryx obtruncata, but the forewing outer margin is less curved and the hindwing apex is evenly rounded. There is an incomplete line on the forewing upperside running from the costa towards the middle of the outer margin, dividing the light brown apical area from the deep brown discal area. The antemedian band has a pale basal edge. The hindwing upperside is almost uniformly dark brown with a lighter patch at the tornus. The forewing underside has two distinct median lines.

== Gallery ==
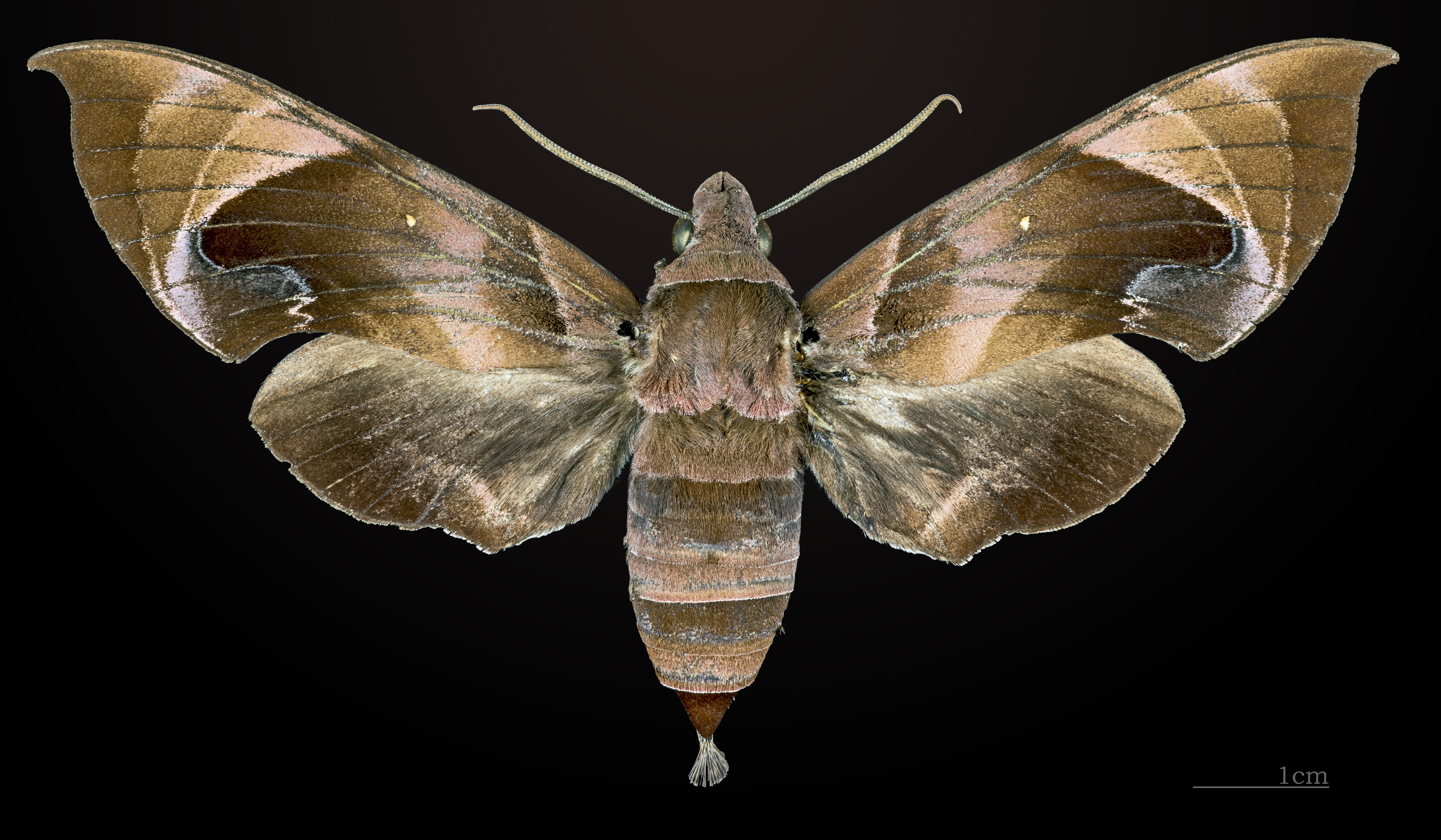
Female

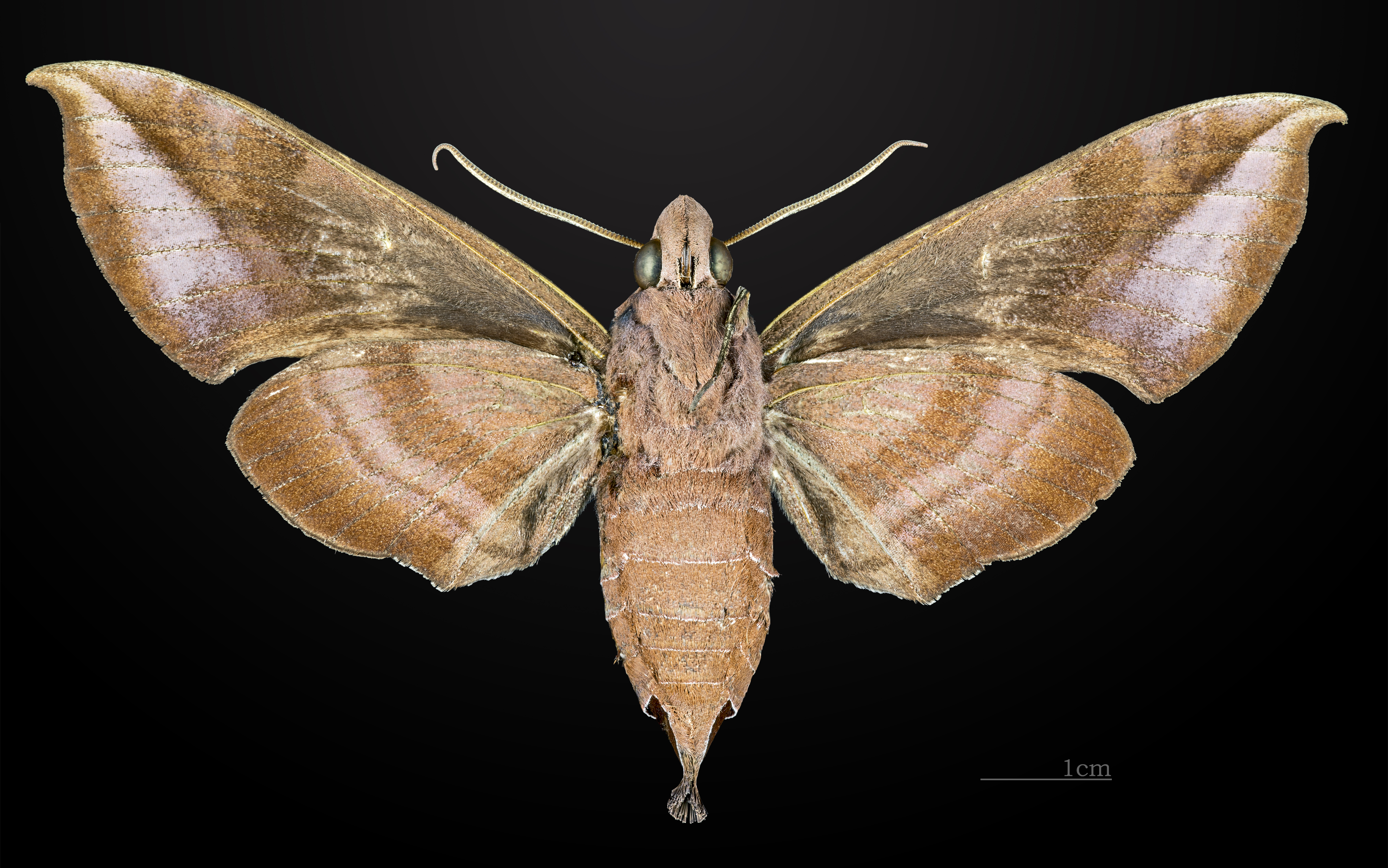
Female underside

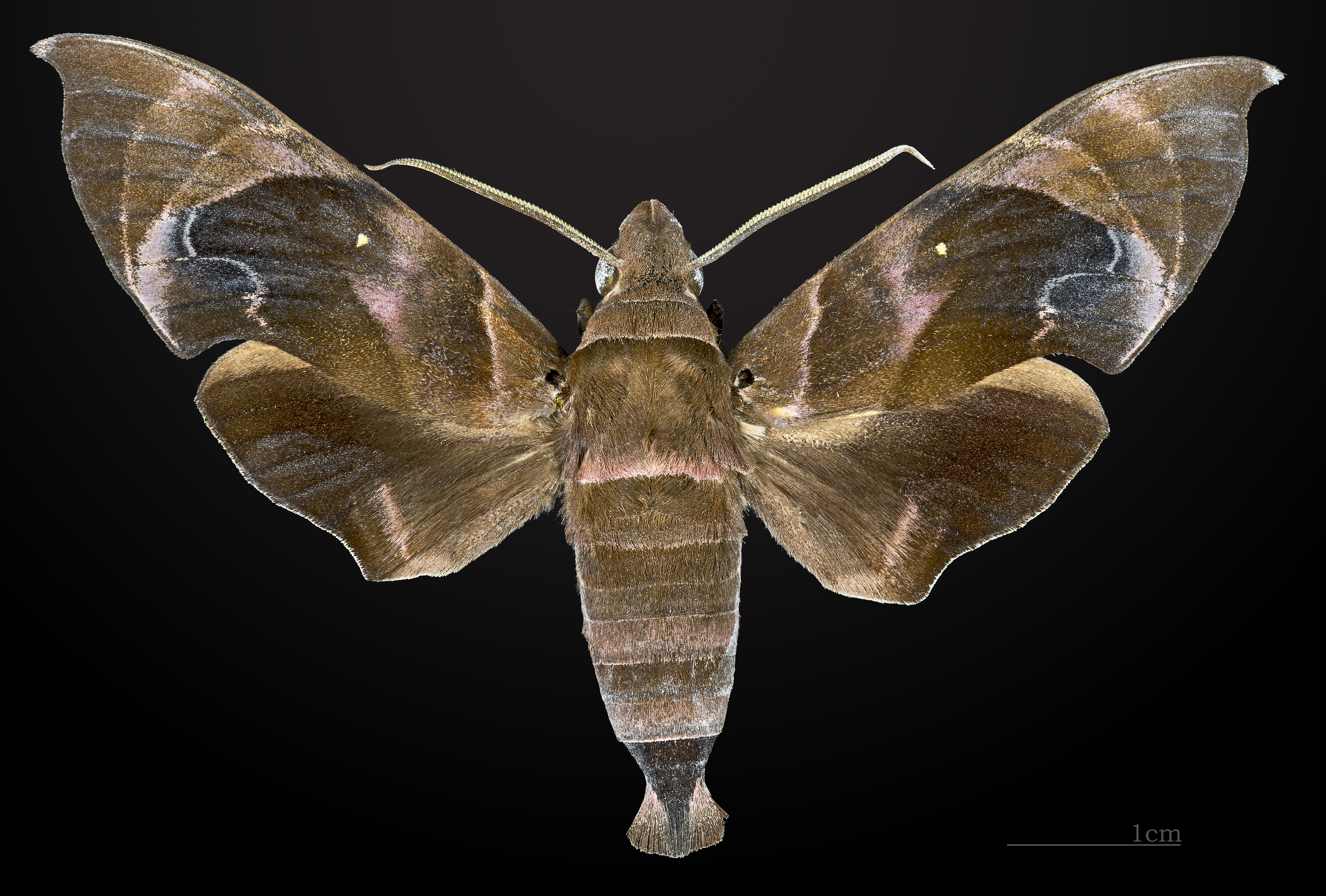
Male

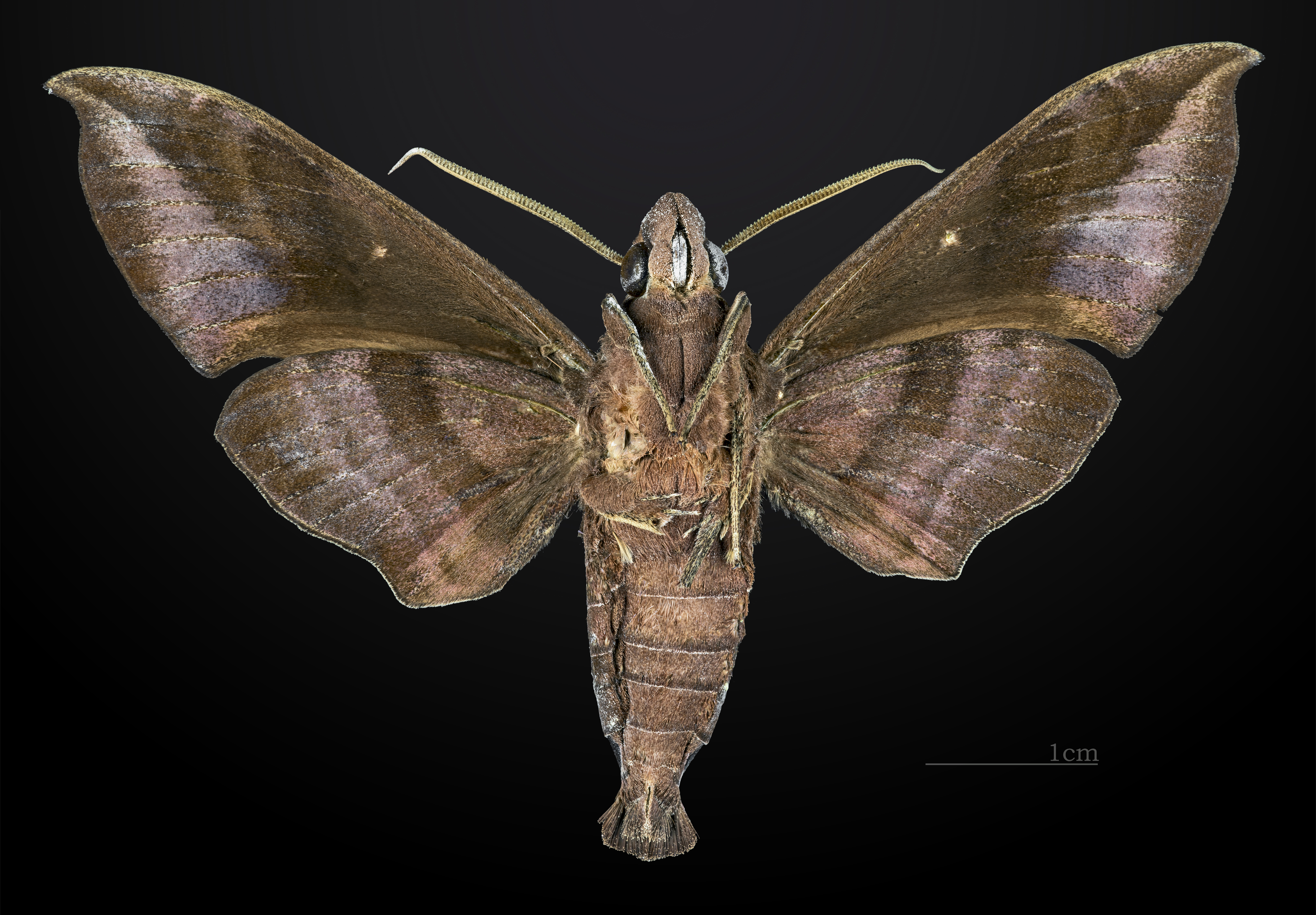
Male underside

== Distribution ==
It is known from Nepal, north-eastern India, from south-western to central China, Thailand, Malaysia (Peninsular, Sarawak) and Indonesia (Sumatra, Java, Kalimantan).

== Biology ==
The larvae feed on Alstonia species.
