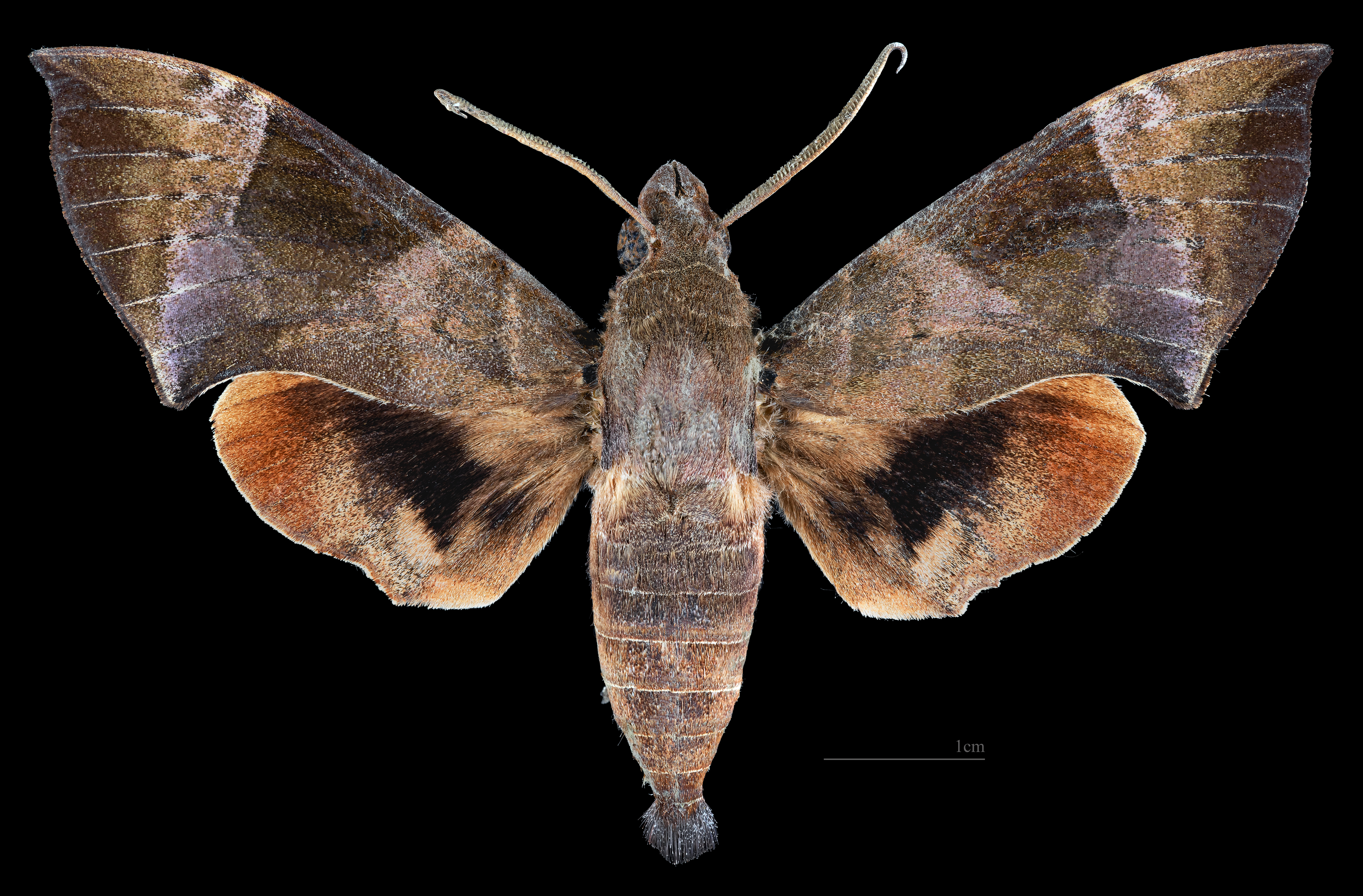
- Male dorsal
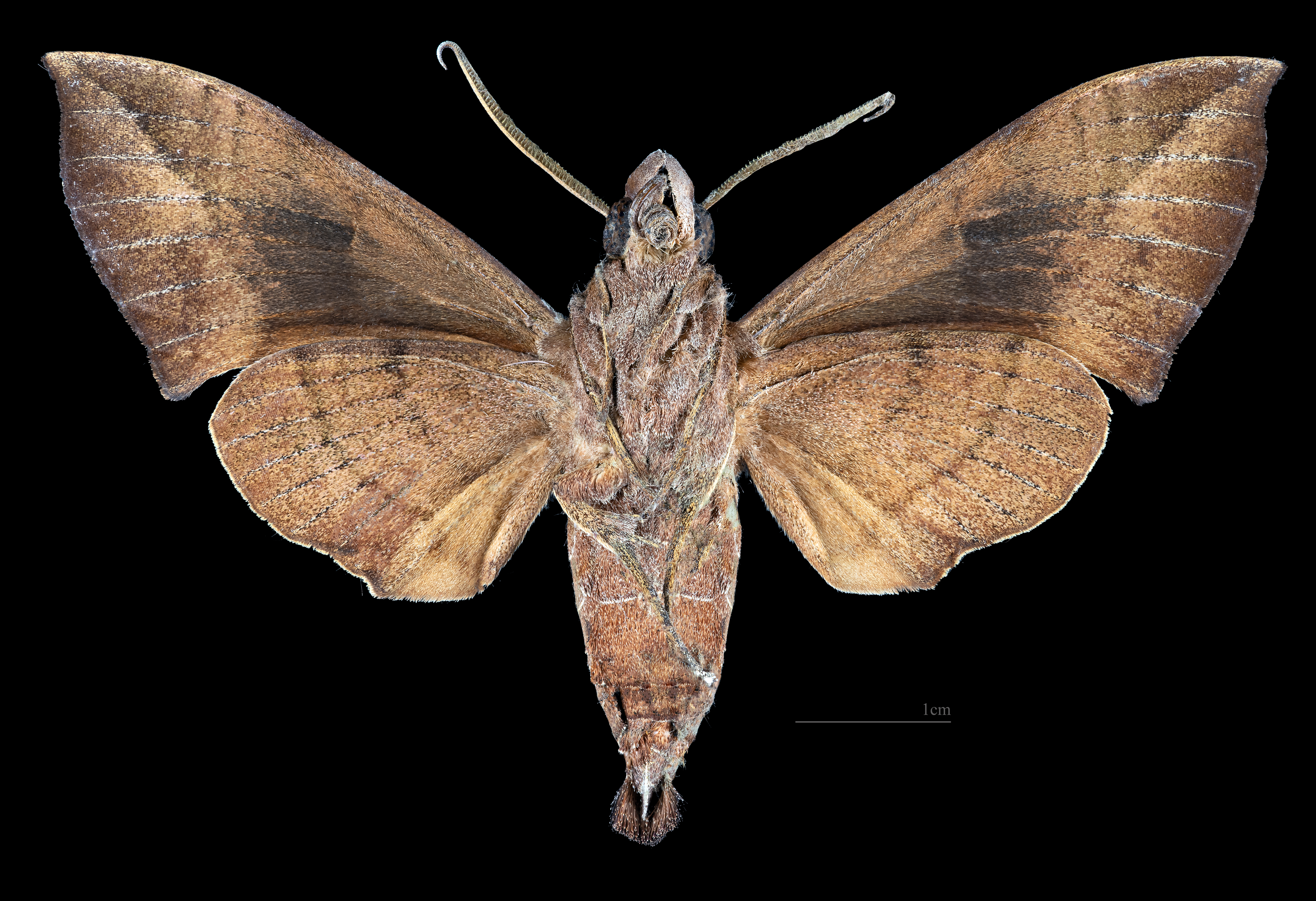
- Male ventral

Scientific classification
- Kingdom: Animalia
- Phylum: Arthropoda
- Class: Insecta
- Order: Lepidoptera
- Family: Sphingidae
- Genus: Eurypteryx
- Species: E. alleni

Binomial name
- Eurypteryx alleni Hogenes & Treadaway, 1993

= Eurypteryx alleni =

Species of moth

Eurypteryx alleni is a moth of the family Sphingidae. It is found in the Philippines, Sulawesi, Malaysia, Burma, Thailand and probably part of Indonesia.

The length of the forewings is 38–40 mm.

== Subspecies ==
- Eurypteryx alleni alleni (the Philippines and Sulawesi)
- Eurypteryx alleni gigas Haxaire, 2010 (Malaysia, Burma, Thailand and probably part of Indonesia)
