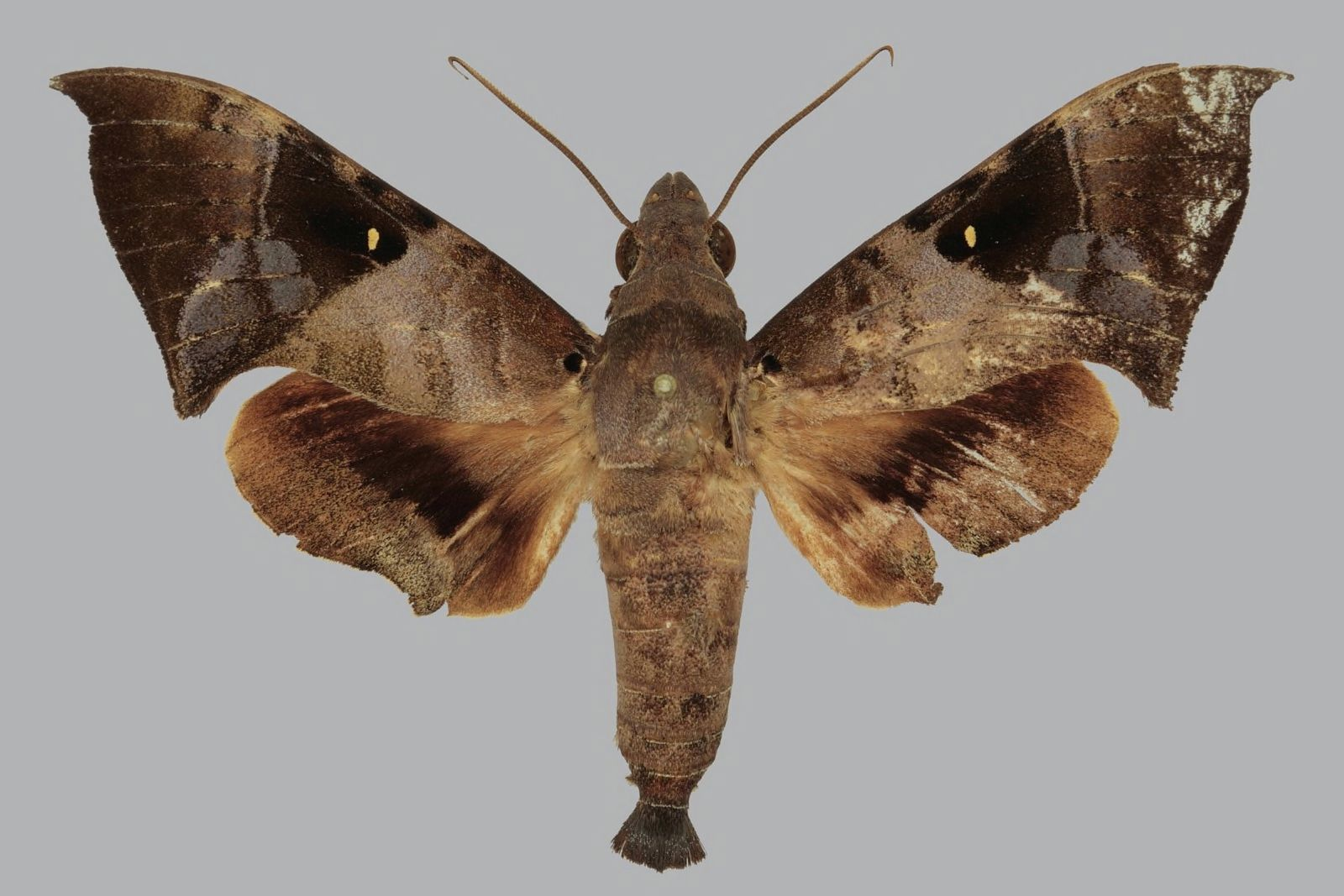

Scientific classification
- Kingdom: Animalia
- Phylum: Arthropoda
- Class: Insecta
- Order: Lepidoptera
- Family: Sphingidae
- Genus: Eurypteryx
- Species: E. falcata

Binomial name
- Eurypteryx falcata Gehlen, 1922

= Eurypteryx falcata =

Species of moth

Eurypteryx falcata is a moth of the family Sphingidae. It is known from Papua New Guinea.
