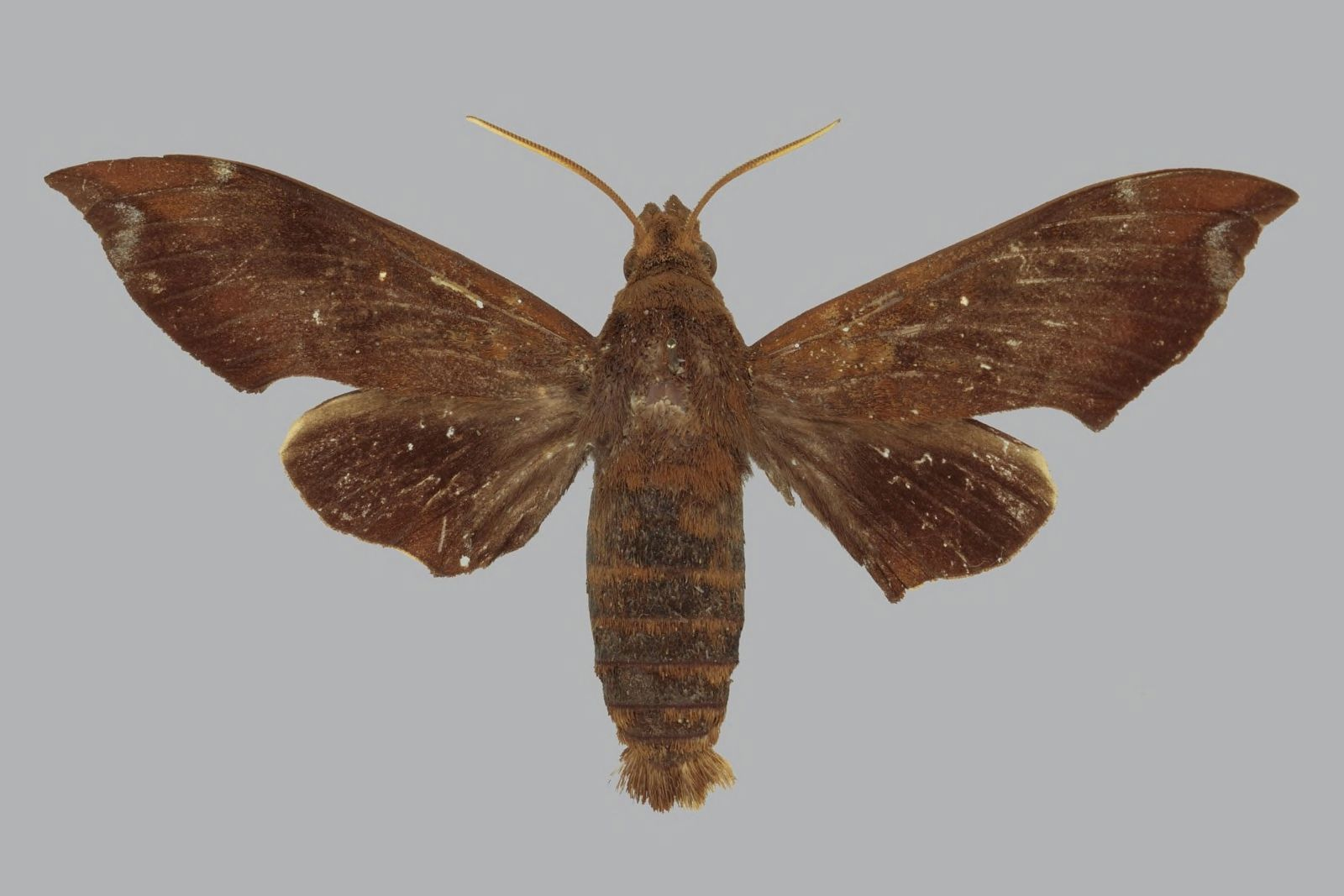

Scientific classification
- Kingdom: Animalia
- Phylum: Arthropoda
- Class: Insecta
- Order: Lepidoptera
- Family: Sphingidae
- Genus: Eurypteryx
- Species: E. shelfordi

Binomial name
- Eurypteryx shelfordi Rothschild & Jordan, 1903

Synonyms
- Eurypteryx pendleburyi Clark, 1925

= Eurypteryx shelfordi =

Species of moth

Eurypteryx shelfordi is a moth of the family Sphingidae first described by Rothschild and Jordan in 1903. It is known from Borneo and Sumatra.

The length of the forewings is 42–46 mm. The abdominal anal tuft is dark brown, like the rest of the body. The antennae are cream dorsally and brown towards the base. The upperside of the thorax and abdomen are russet brown. The underside of the thorax and abdomen are dark brown with a grey flush and the tibiae is orange. The forewing is almost uniformly brown, with the middle area and distal margin area deeper brown. There is a round white stigma with a white dot in front. The forewing underside has a white discal spot. There is a small white preapical costal patch. The hindwing upperside is dull brown and orange near tornus. The hindwing underside has a marginal area that is markedly darker than the postmedian area, which is shaded with a bluish tinge and traversed by two dark lines.
