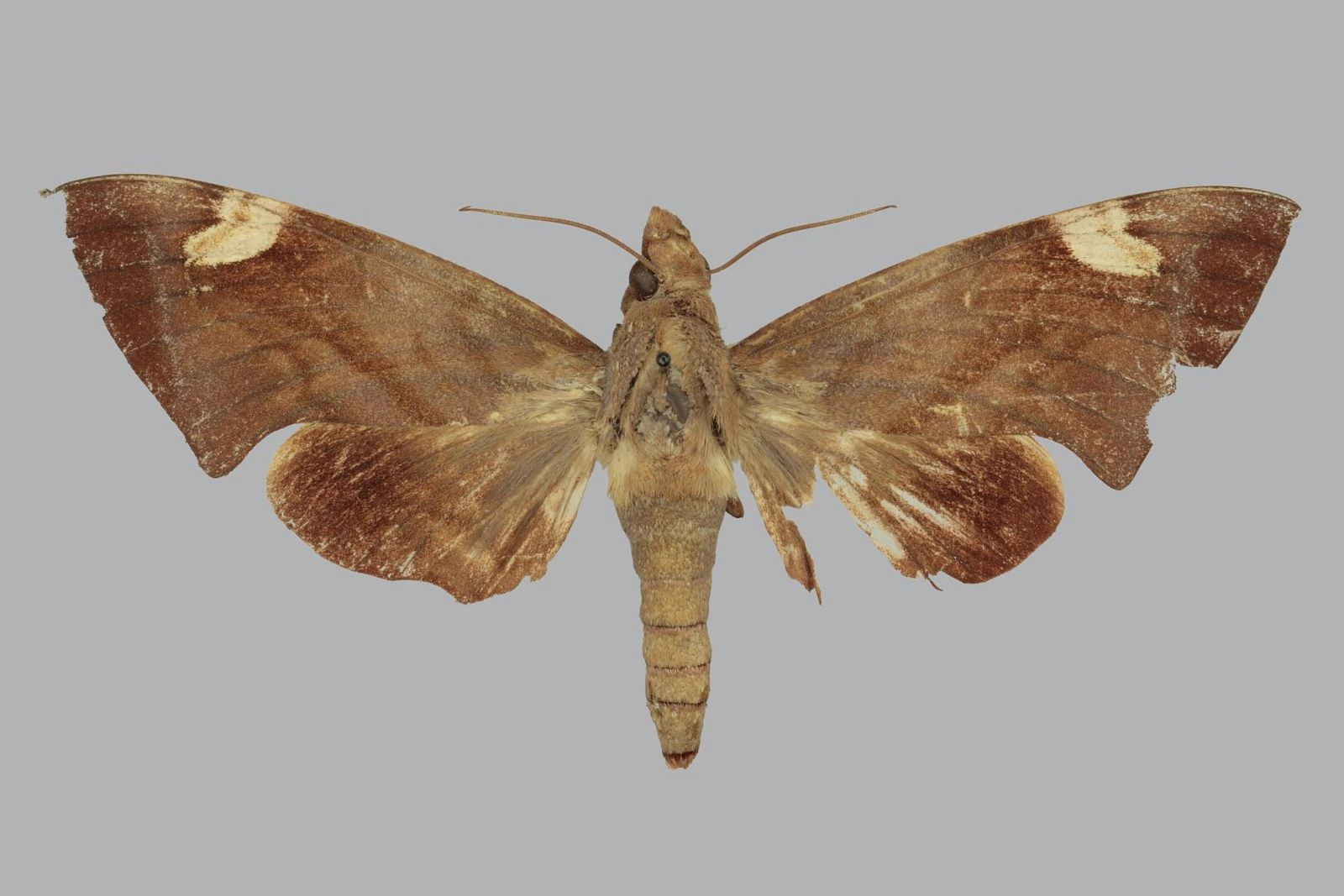

Scientific classification
- Kingdom: Animalia
- Phylum: Arthropoda
- Class: Insecta
- Order: Lepidoptera
- Family: Sphingidae
- Genus: Eurypteryx
- Species: E. molucca

Binomial name
- Eurypteryx molucca Felder, 1874

Synonyms
- Aleuron biovatus Oberthür, 1894; Eurypteryx molucca niepelti Clark, 1935; Eurypteryx molucca obiana Huwe, 1906

= Eurypteryx molucca =

Species of moth

Eurypteryx molucca is a moth of the family Sphingidae. It is known from the Philippines (Mindoro), the Moluccas and Papua New Guinea.

It is easily distinguished from all other Eurypteryx species by the conspicuous off-white patch on the forewing upperside near the apex.
