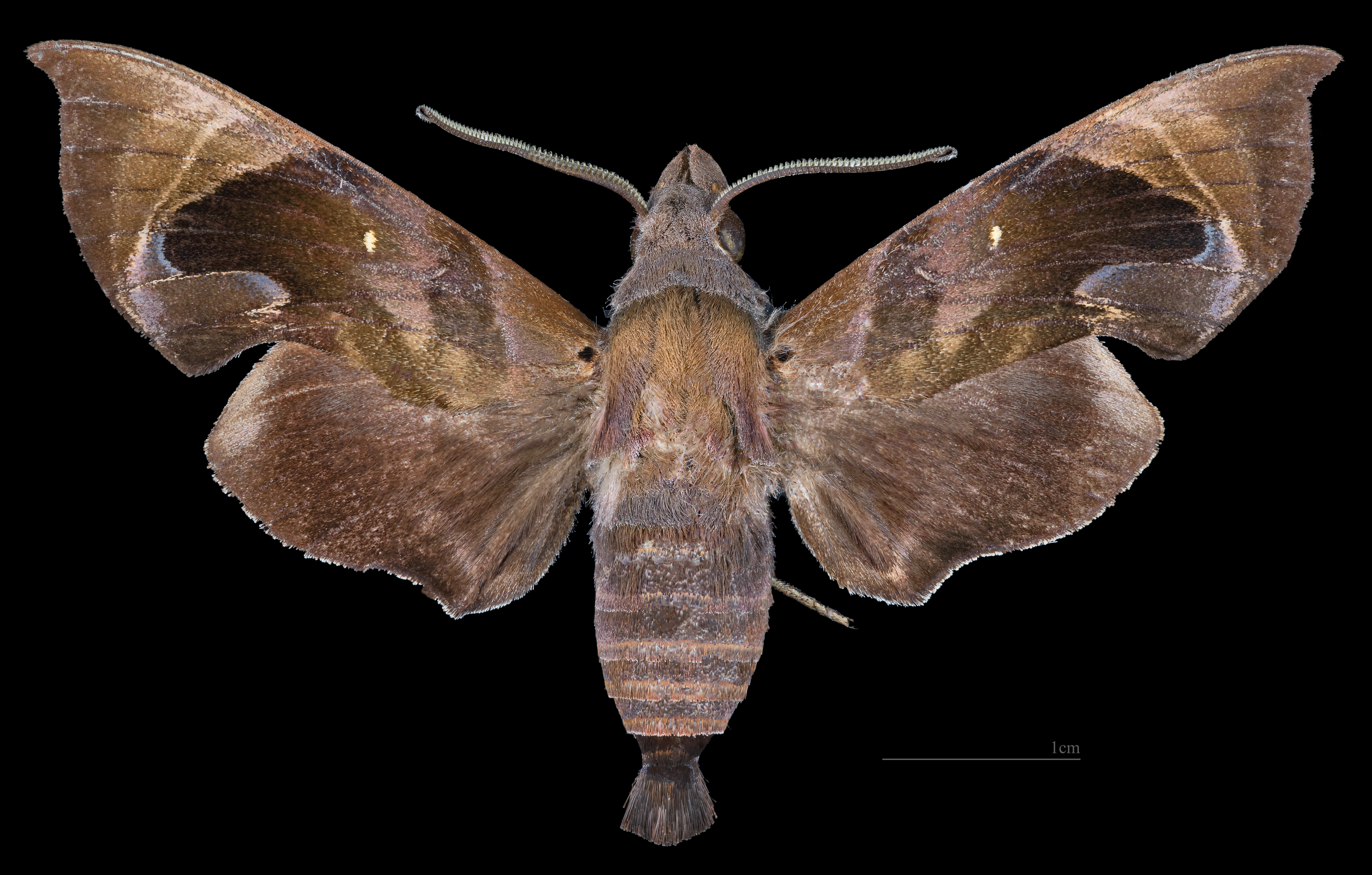
- Eurypteryx obtruncata Male dorsal
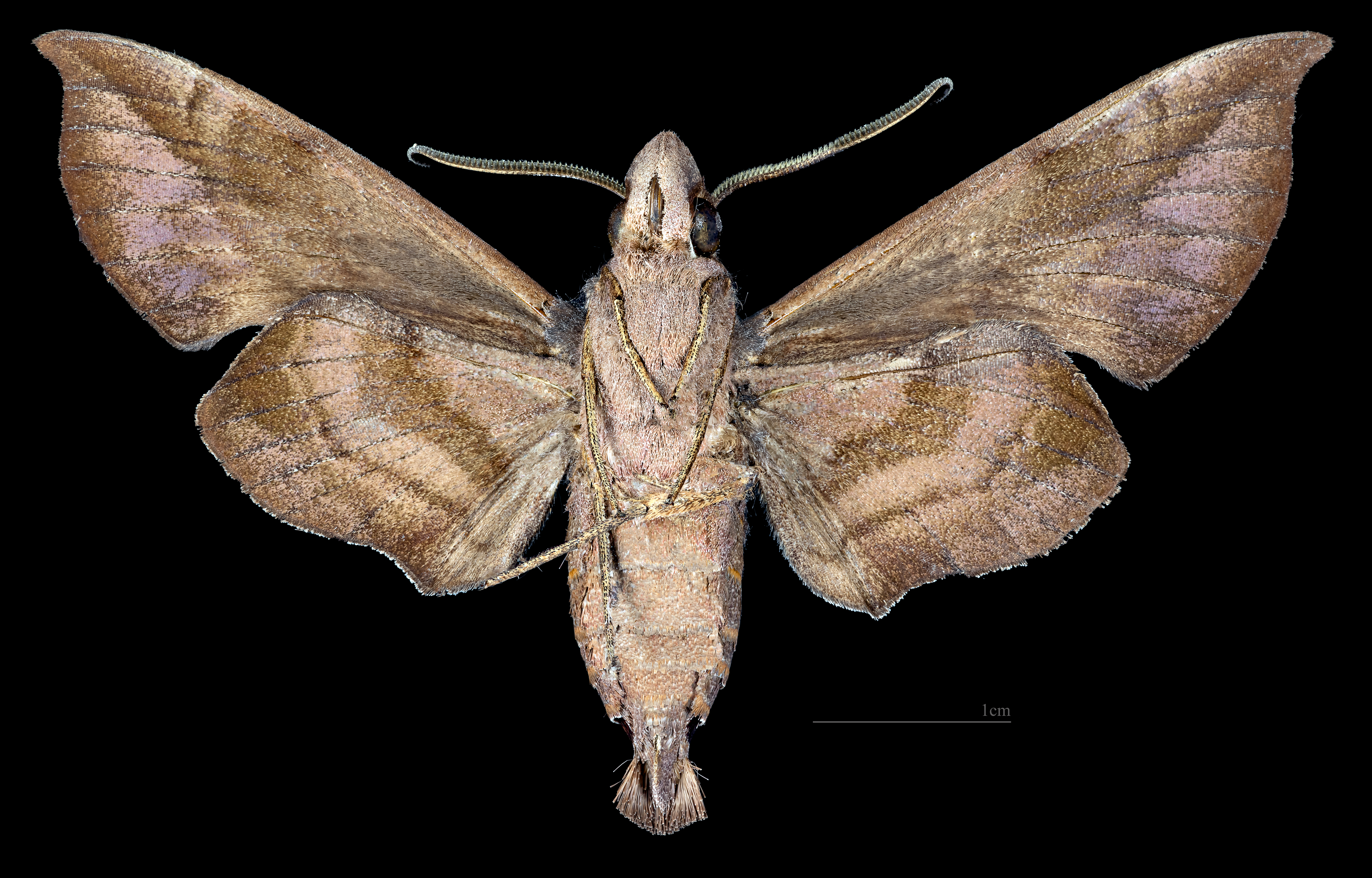
- Eurypteryx obtruncata Male ventral

Scientific classification
- Kingdom: Animalia
- Phylum: Arthropoda
- Class: Insecta
- Order: Lepidoptera
- Family: Sphingidae
- Genus: Eurypteryx
- Species: E. obtruncata

Binomial name
- Eurypteryx obtruncata Rothschild & Jordan, 1903

Synonyms
- Eurypteryx sulai Eitschberger, 1999

= Eurypteryx obtruncata =

Species of moth

Eurypteryx obtruncata is a moth of the family Sphingidae. It is known from Sulawesi.

It is similar to Eurypteryx bhaga, but the forewing outer margin is more curved and the hindwing apex is obtusely cut. The forewing upperside has an antemedian band lacking a pale border. The forewing underside has no distinct median lines.
