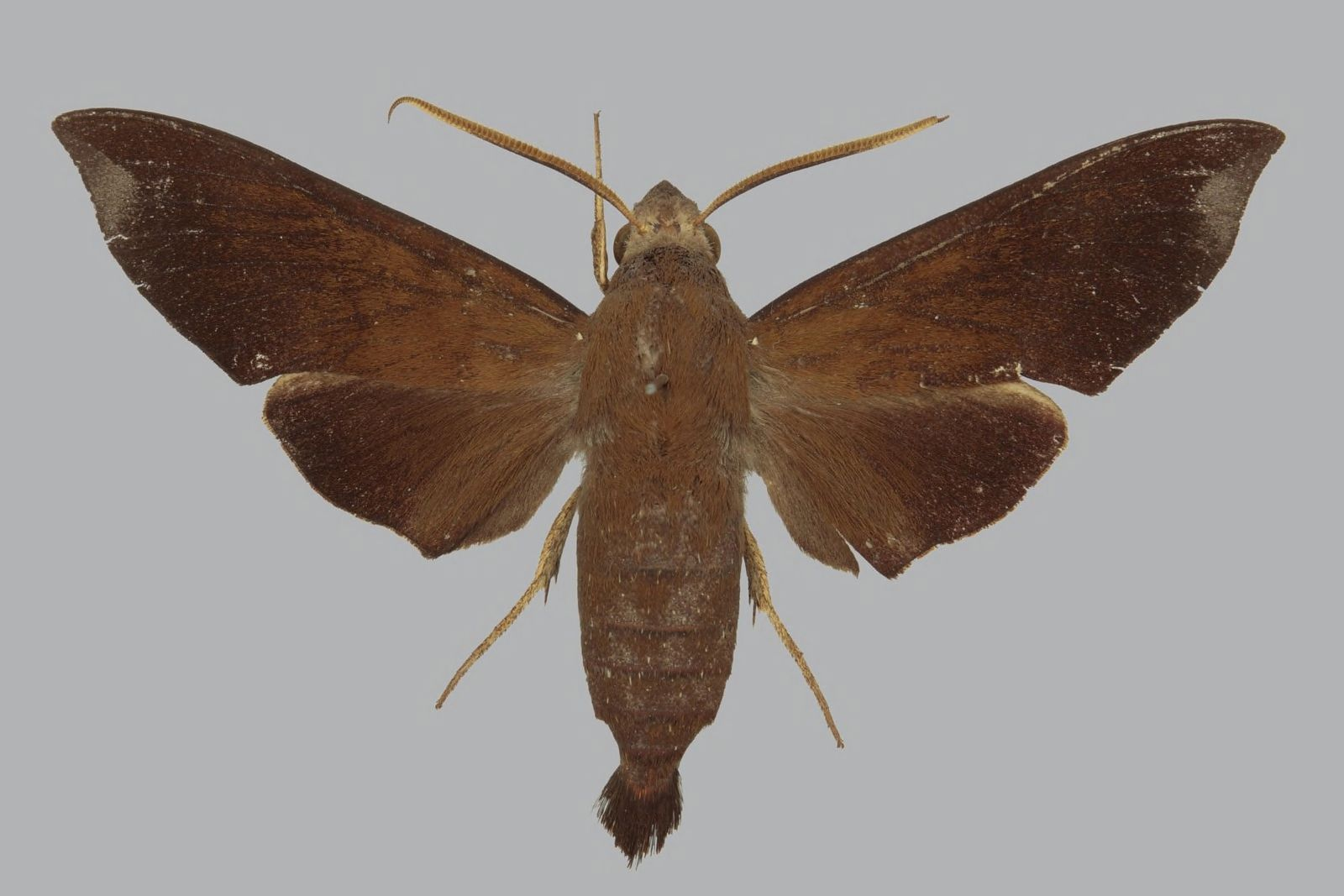

Scientific classification
- Kingdom: Animalia
- Phylum: Arthropoda
- Clade: Pancrustacea
- Class: Insecta
- Order: Lepidoptera
- Family: Sphingidae
- Genus: Eurypteryx
- Species: E. geoffreyi

Binomial name
- Eurypteryx geoffreyi Cadiou & Kitching, 1990

= Eurypteryx geoffreyi =

Species of moth

Eurypteryx geoffreyi is a moth of the family Sphingidae. It is known from Thailand.

The length of the forewings is 31 mm for males and 38 mm for females.
