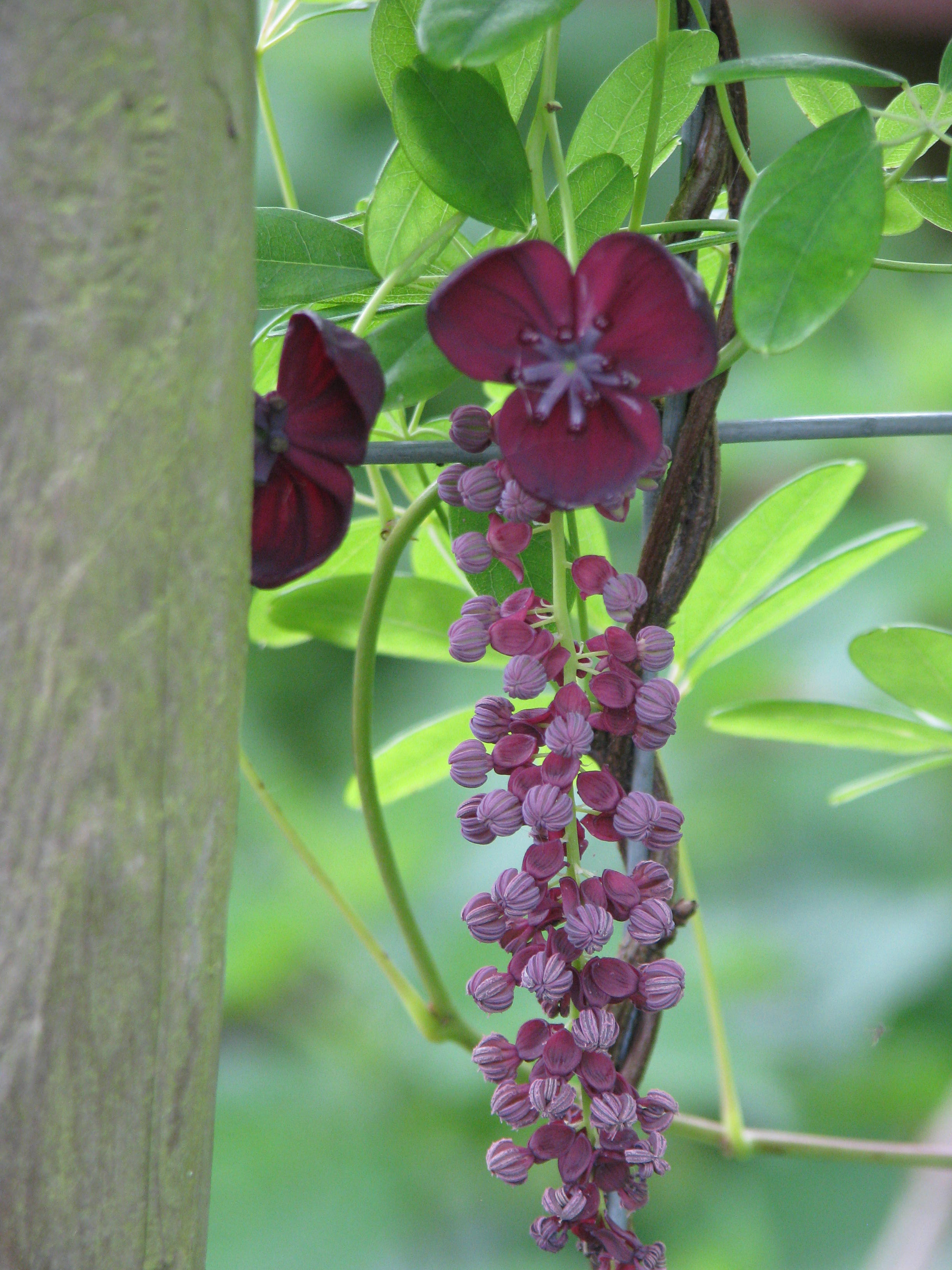

Scientific classification
- Kingdom: Plantae
- Clade: Tracheophytes
- Clade: Angiosperms
- Clade: Eudicots
- Order: Ranunculales
- Family: Lardizabalaceae
- Genus: Akebia
- Species: A. longeracemosa

Binomial name
- Akebia longeracemosa Matsum.

= Akebia longeracemosa =

Species of plant

Akebia longeracemosa or long-racemed akebia is a member of the chocolate vine genus, Akebia, and more specifically a relative of the commonly known, Akebia quinata.

== Description ==
It is a twining, semi-evergreen climbing vine which grows up to 8m tall with bright green foliage comprising five, oblong leaflets that may be tinged purple in winter. Fragrant, cup-shaped, purple-red spring flowers borne in pendulous racemes to 15cm long may be followed by purplish, sausage-shaped fruits if cross pollination between two separate species or varieties occurs.

Morphological and molecular evidence suggests that A. longeracemosa is possibly a hybrid between A. quinata and A. trifoliata.

== Uses ==
=== Culinary ===
Like most species of Akebia, A. longeracemosa can be eaten and produces purple fruiting bodies similar to A. quinata however there is a lack of information regarding the flavor of this species in particular.

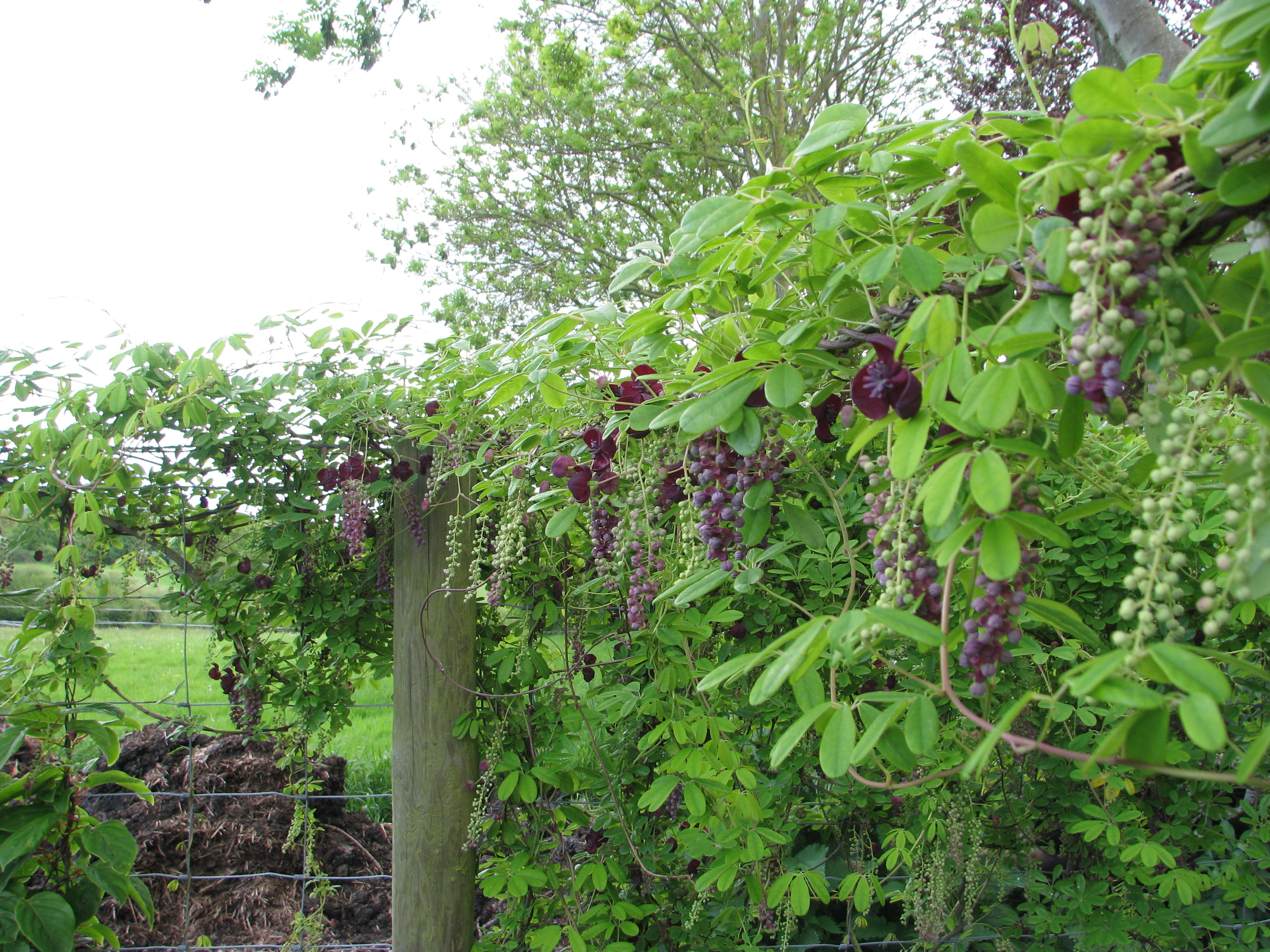
A. longeracemosa growing in garden

== Gallery ==
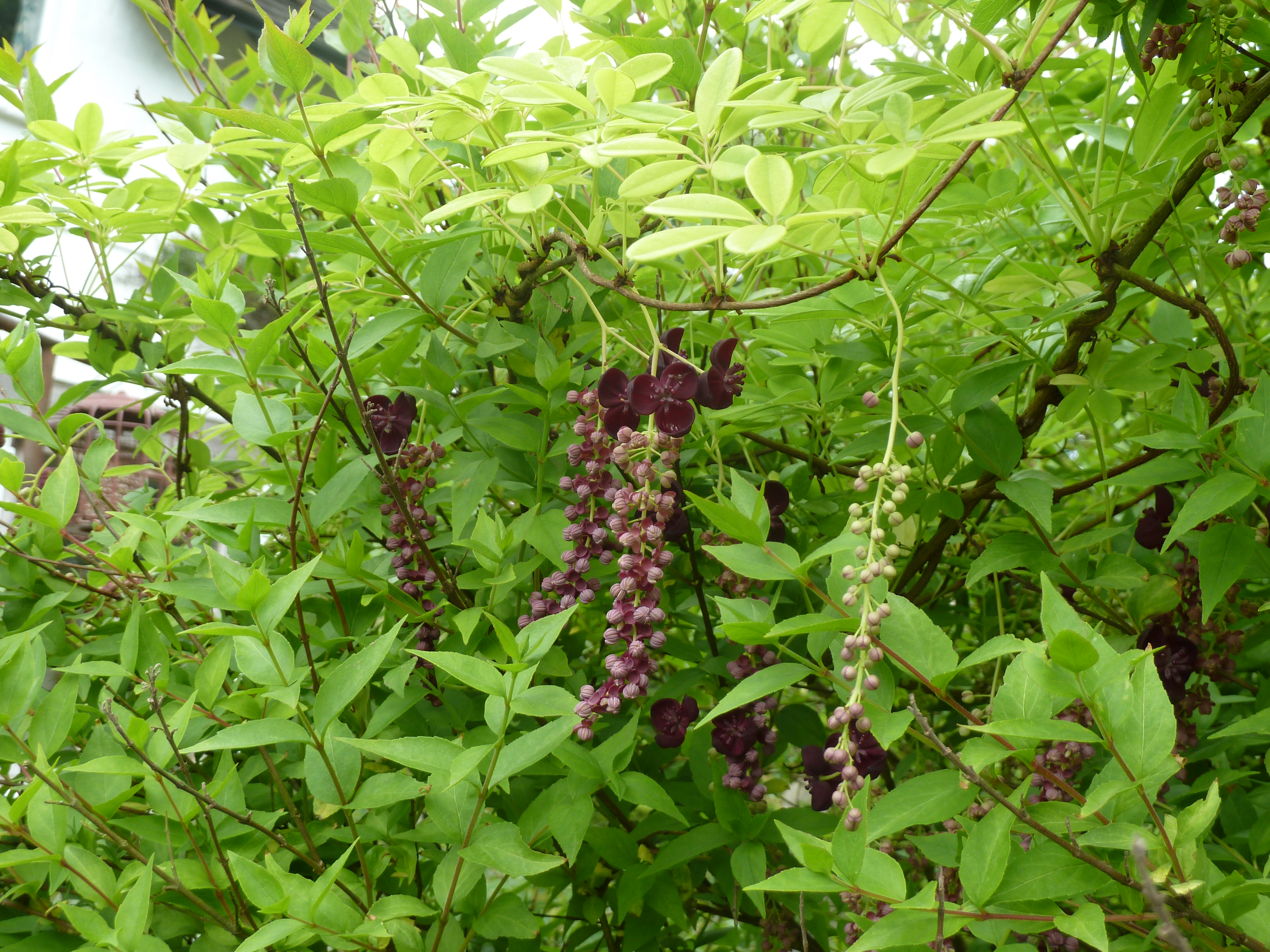
A. longeracemosa flower cluster

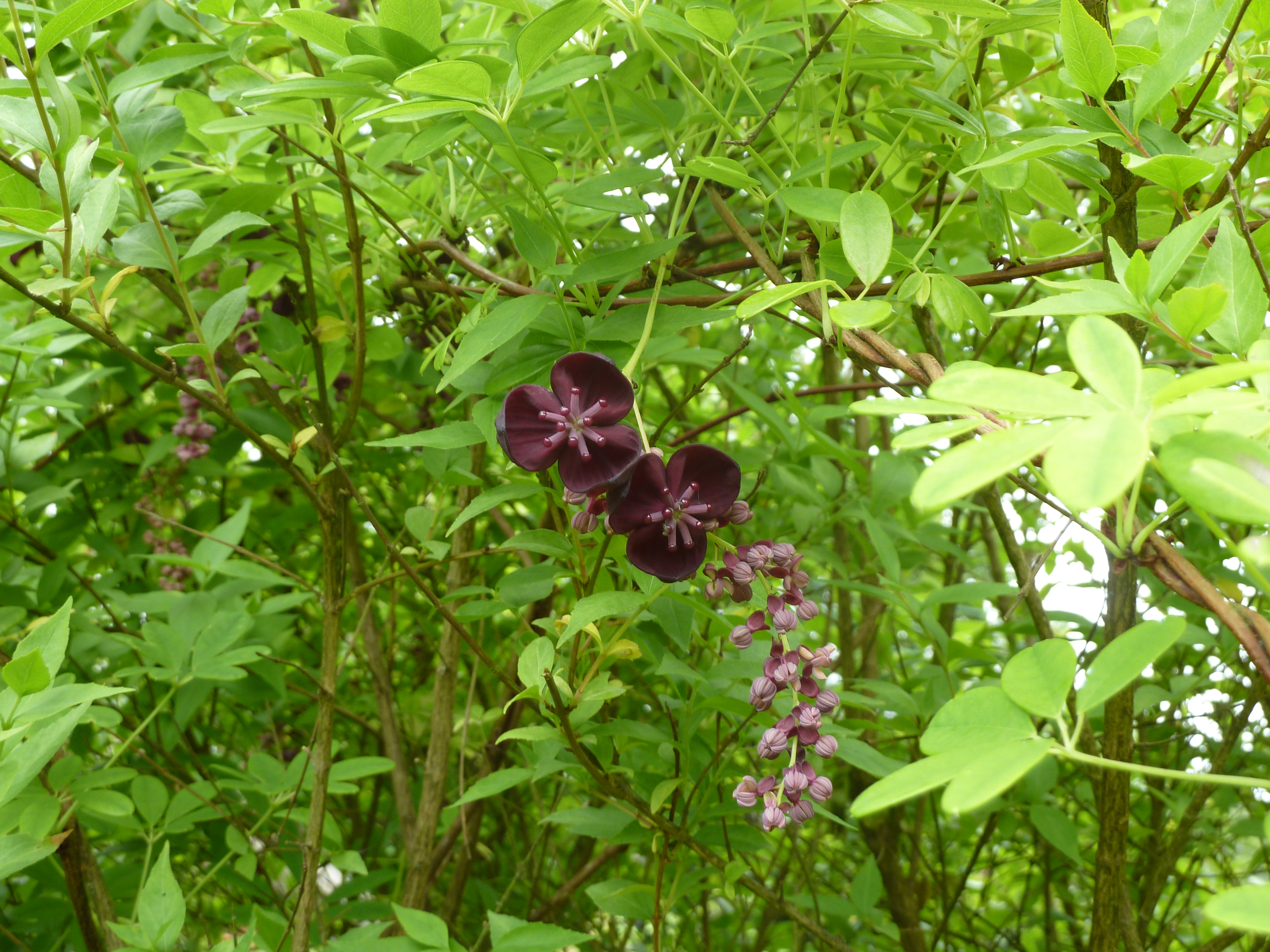
Female flowers (center dark colored) Male flowers (smaller pink lower right)
