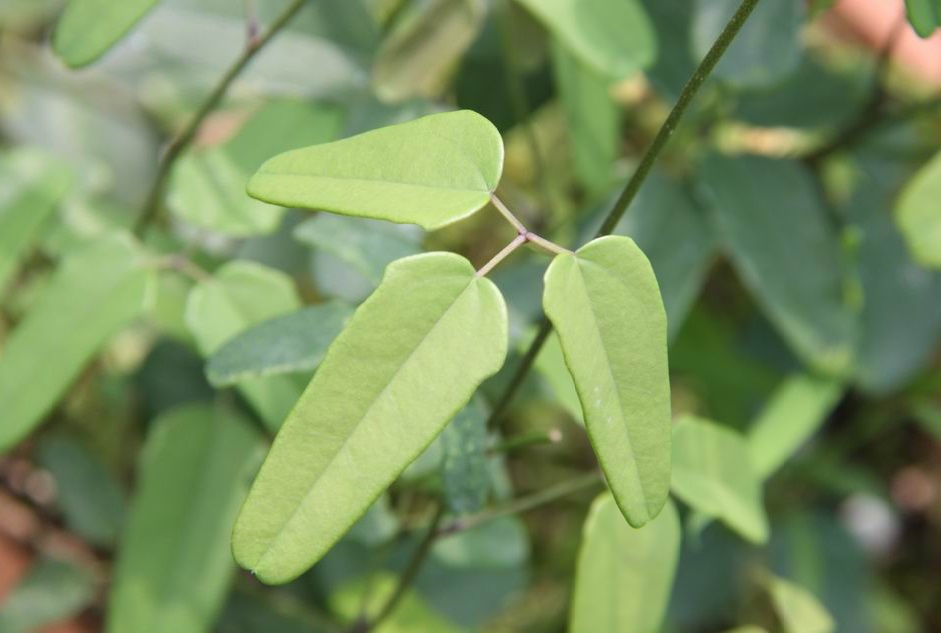

Scientific classification
- Kingdom: Plantae
- Clade: Tracheophytes
- Clade: Angiosperms
- Clade: Eudicots
- Order: Ranunculales
- Family: Lardizabalaceae
- Genus: Akebia
- Species: A. chingshuiensis

Binomial name
- Akebia chingshuiensis T.Shimizu

= Akebia chingshuiensis =

Species of Akebia

Akebia chingshuiensis is a member of the Akebia family native to China. It is a rarer species of Akebia and has a smaller range than Akebia trifoliata or Akebia quinata.

== Description ==
Akebia chingshuiensis is a subspecies of Akebia trifoliata from China and has been used in traditional Chinese medicine for over 2000 years.
