= Vine =

Plant with a growth habit of trailing or scandent stems or runners

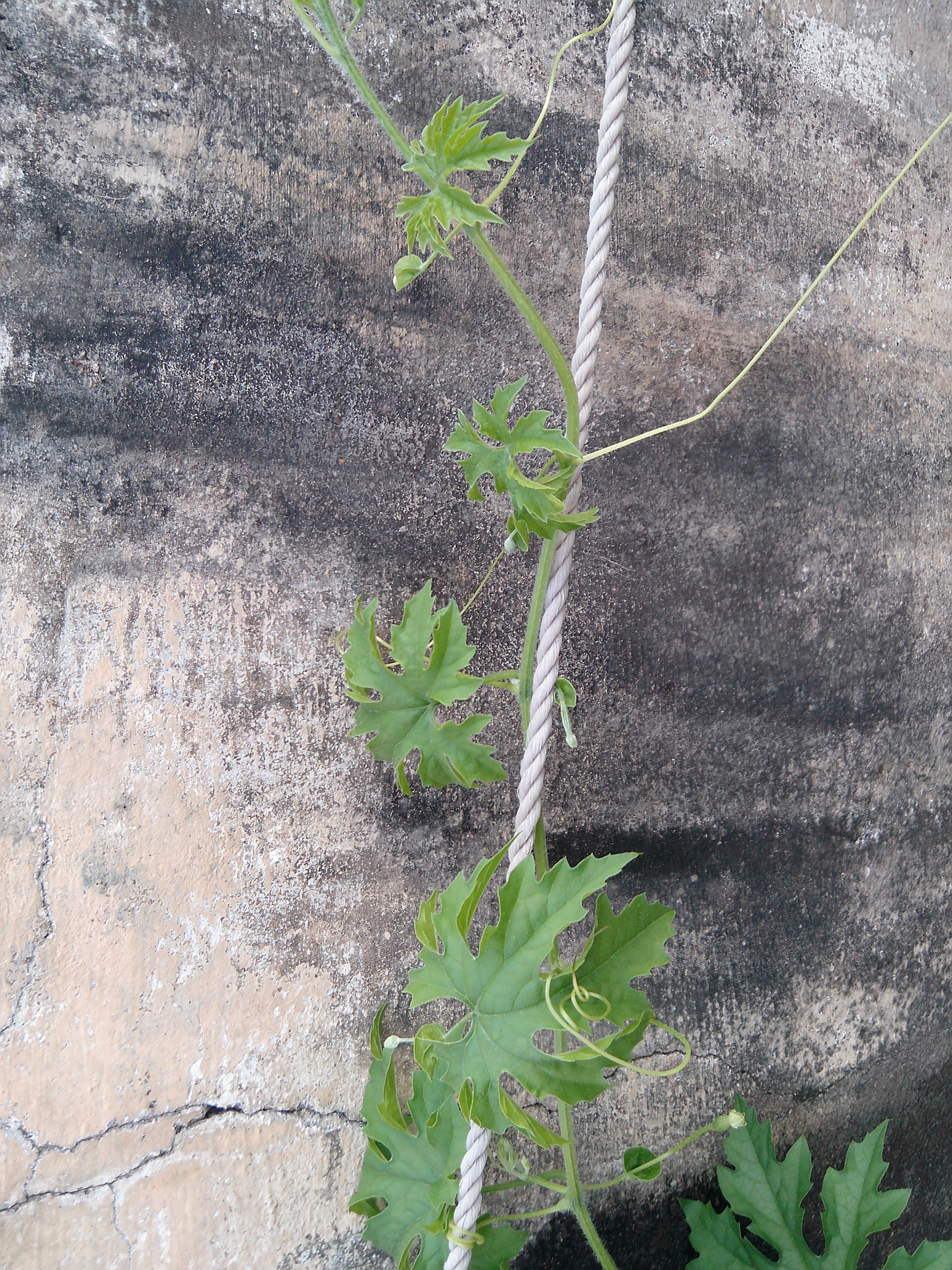
Momordica charantia (bitter melon), a climbing plant

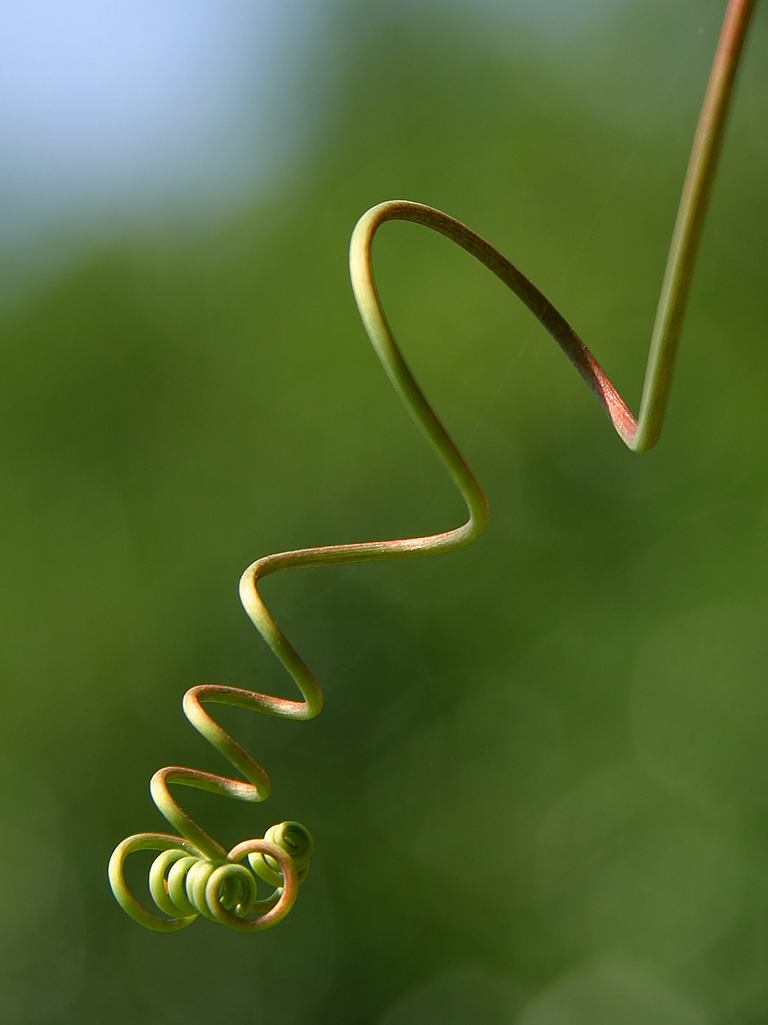
A tendril

A vine is any plant with a growth habit of trailing or scandent (that is, climbing) stems, lianas, or runners. The word vine can also refer to such stems or runners themselves, for instance, when used in wicker work.

In parts of the world, including the British Isles, the term "vine" usually applies exclusively to grapevines, while the term "climber" is used for all climbing plants.

== Growth forms ==
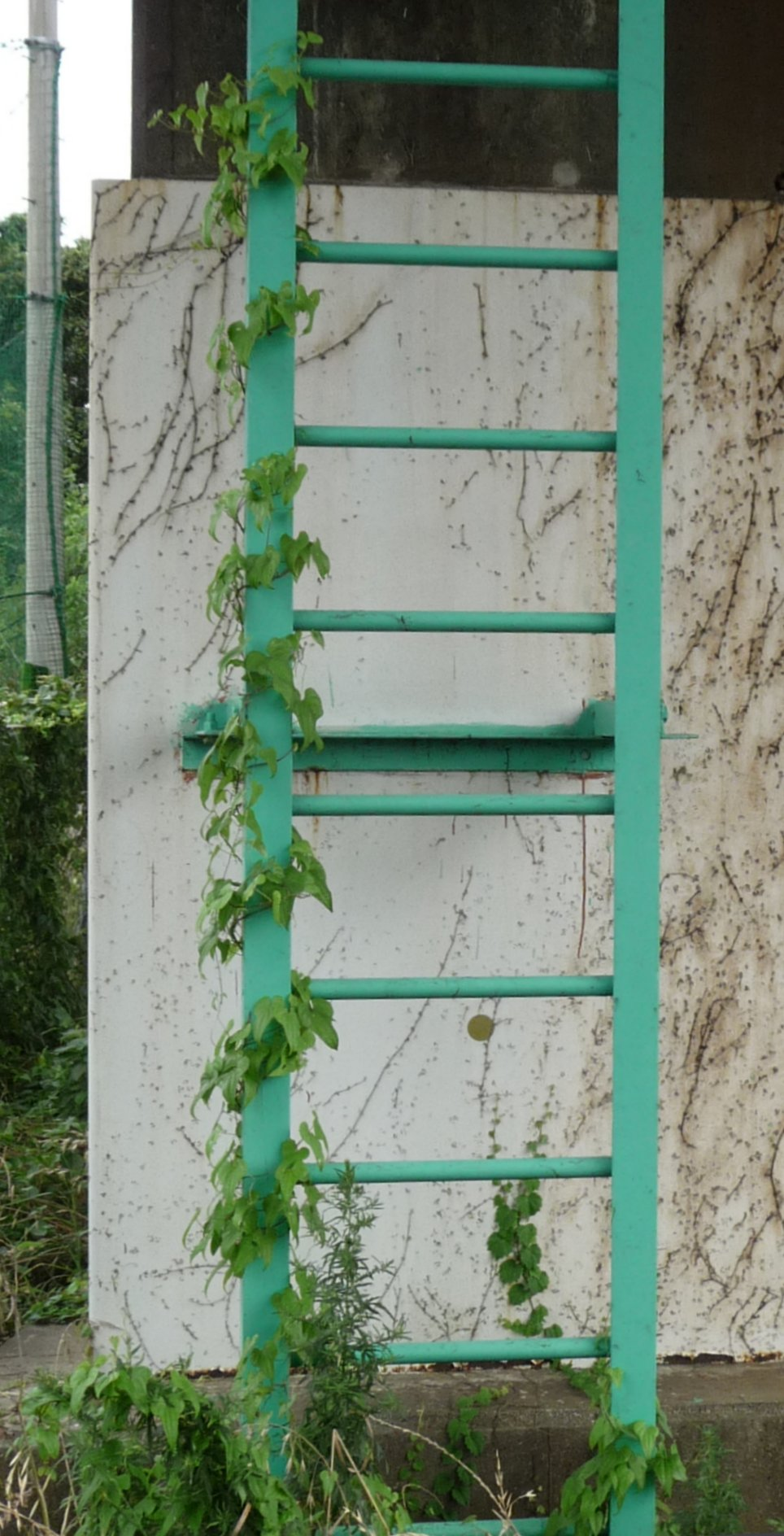
Convolvulus vine twining around a steel fixed ladder

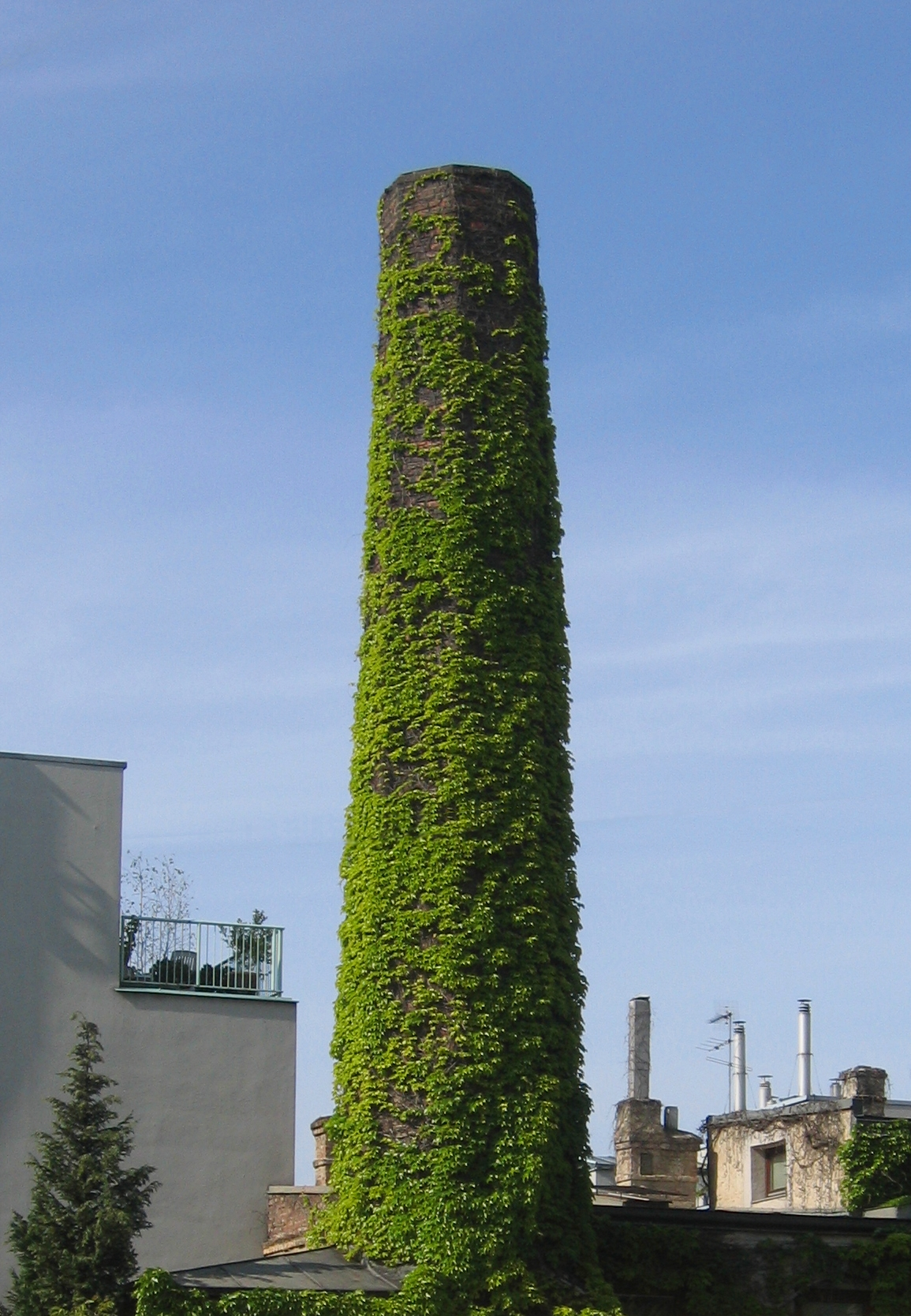
Boston ivy covering a chimney

Certain plants always grow as vines, while a few grow as vines only part of the time. For instance, poison ivy and bittersweet can grow as low shrubs when support is not available, but will become vines when support is available.

A vine displays a growth form based on very long stems. This has two purposes. A vine may use rock exposures, other plants, or other supports for growth rather than investing energy in a lot of supportive tissue, enabling the plant to reach sunlight with a minimum investment of energy. This has been a highly successful growth form for plants such as kudzu and Japanese honeysuckle, both of which are invasive exotics in parts of North America. There are some tropical vines that develop skototropism, and grow away from the light, a type of negative phototropism. Growth away from light allows the vine to reach a tree trunk, which it can then climb to brighter regions.

The vine growth form may also enable plants to colonize large areas quickly, even without climbing high. This is the case with periwinkle and ground ivy. It is also an adaptation to life in areas where small patches of fertile soil are adjacent to exposed areas with more sunlight but little or no soil. A vine can root in the soil but have most of its leaves in the brighter, exposed area, getting the best of both environments.

The evolution of a climbing habit has been implicated as a key innovation associated with the evolutionary success and diversification of a number of taxonomic groups of plants. It has evolved independently in several plant families, using many different climbing methods, such as:

- twining the stem around a support (e.g., morning glories, Ipomoea species)
- by way of adventitious, clinging roots (e.g., ivy, Hedera species)
- with twining petioles (e.g., Clematis species)
- using tendrils, which can be specialized shoots (Vitaceae), leaves (Bignoniaceae), or even inflorescences (Passiflora)
- using tendrils which also produce adhesive pads at the end that attach themselves quite strongly to the support (Parthenocissus)
- using thorns (e.g. climbing rose) or other hooked structures, such as hooked branches (e.g. Artabotrys hexapetalus)

The climbing fetterbush (Pieris phillyreifolia) is a woody shrub-vine which climbs without clinging roots, tendrils, or thorns. It directs its stem into a crevice in the bark of fibrous barked trees (such as bald cypress) where the stem adopts a flattened profile and grows up the tree underneath the host tree's outer bark. The fetterbush then sends out branches that emerge near the top of the tree.

Most vines are flowering plants. These may be divided into woody vines or lianas, such as akebia wisteria, kiwifruit, and common ivy, and herbaceous (nonwoody) vines, such as morning glory.

One odd group of vining plants is the fern genus Lygodium, called climbing ferns. The stem does not climb, but rather the fronds (leaves) do. The fronds unroll from the tip, and theoretically never stop growing; they can form thickets as they unroll over other plants, rockfaces, and fences.

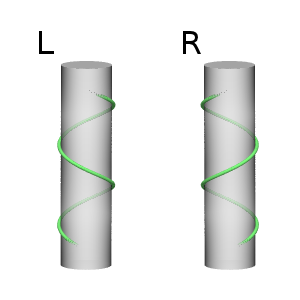
L: A left-handed bine grows in an anticlockwise direction (viewed from the point of view of the plant: S-twist). R: A right-handed bine grows in a clockwise direction. (Z-twist)

=== Twining vines ===
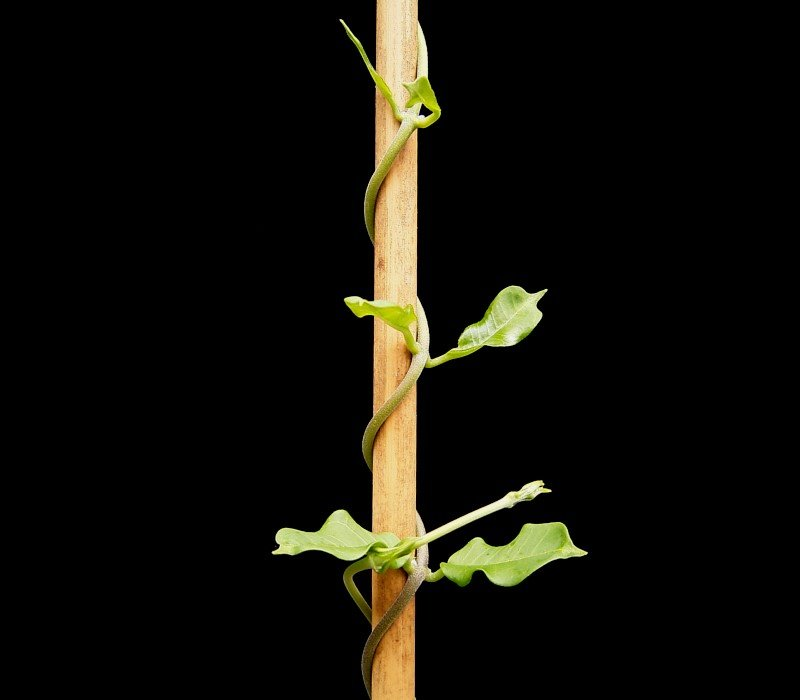
Twining vine / bine (Fockea edulis)

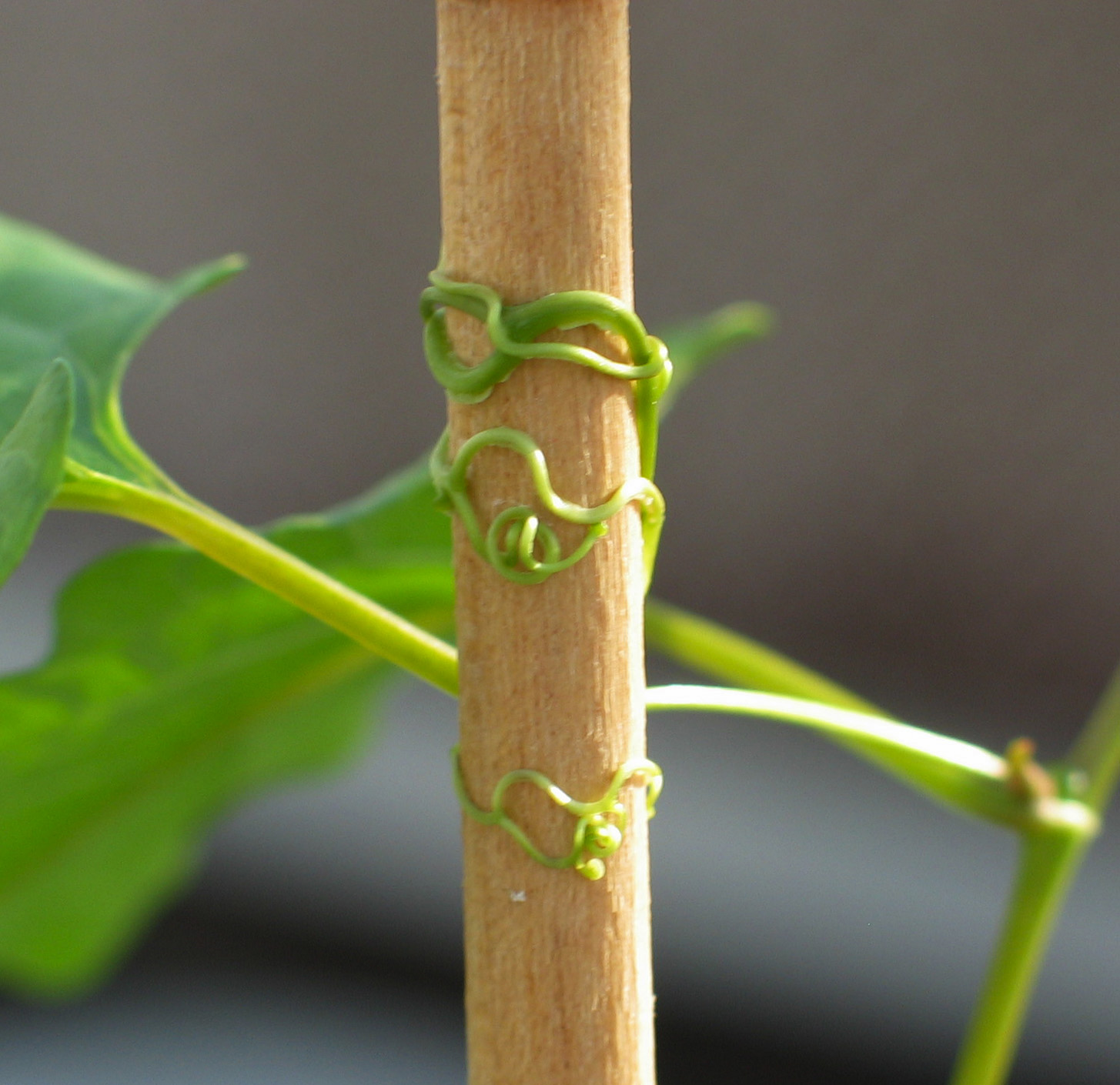
Tendril-supported vine (Brunnichia ovata)

A twining vine, also known as a bine, climbs by its shoots growing in a helix, in contrast to vines that climb using tendrils or suckers. Many bines have rough stems or downward-pointing bristles to aid their grip. Hops (used in flavoring beer) are a commercially important example of a bine. Compare "woodbines", a common name that is used to refer to both bines such as Lonicera periclymenum, a honeysuckle, and some Parthenocissus species, which have tendrils.

The direction of rotation of the shoot tip during climbing is autonomous and does not (as is sometimes imagined folk-scientifically) result from the shoot's following the sun around the sky – the direction of twist does not therefore depend upon which north-south hemisphere the plant is growing on. This is shown by the fact that some bines always twine clockwise, including runner bean (Phaseolus coccineus) and bindweed (Convolvulus species), while others twine anticlockwise, including black bryony (Dioscorea communis) and climbing honeysuckles (Lonicera species).

The contrasting rotations of bindweed and honeysuckle was the theme of the satirical song "Misalliance", written and sung by Michael Flanders and Donald Swann. Incidentally, the lyrics confuse the direction of twining, describing honeysuckle as right-handed and bindweed as left-handed.

== Horticultural climbing plants ==
The term "vine" also applies to Cucurbitaceae, including cucumbers, where botanists refer to creeping vines; in commercial agriculture the natural tendency of coiling tendrils to attach themselves to pre-existing structures or espaliers is optimized by the installation of trellis netting.

Gardeners can use the tendency of climbing plants to grow quickly. If a plant display is wanted quickly, a climber can achieve this. Climbers can be trained over walls, pergolas, fences, etc. Climbers can be grown over other plants to provide additional attraction. Artificial support can also be provided. Some climbers climb by themselves; others need work, such as tying them in and training them.

== Scientific description ==
Vines widely differ in size, form and evolutionary origin. Darwin classified climbing groups based on their climbing method. He classified five classes of vines – twining plants, leaf climbers, tendril bearers, root climbers and hook climbers.

Vines have multiple evolutionary origins. They usually reside in tropical locations and have the unique ability to climb. Vines are able to grow in both deep shade and full sun due to their uniquely wide range of phenotypic plasticity. This climbing action prevents shading by neighbors and allows the vine to grow out of reach of herbivores. The environment where a vine can grow successfully is determined by the climbing mechanism of a vine and how far it can spread across supports. There are many theories supporting the idea that photosynthetic responses are closely related to climbing mechanisms.

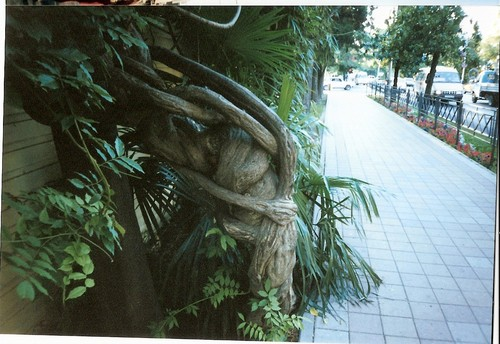
A large Apios vine on the street in Sochi, Russia

Temperate twining vines, which twist tightly around supports, are typically poorly adapted for climbing beneath closed canopies due to their smaller support diameter and shade intolerance. In contrast, tendril vines usually grow on the forest floor and onto trees until they reach the surface of the canopy, suggesting that they have greater physiological plasticity. It has also been suggested that twining vines' revolving growth is mediated by changes in turgor pressure mediated by volume changes in the epidermal cells of the bending zone.

Climbing vines can take on many unique characteristics in response to changes in their environments. Climbing vines can induce chemical defenses and modify their biomass allocation in response to herbivores. In particular, the twisting vine Convolvulus arvensis increases its twining in response to herbivore-associated leaf damage, which may lead to reduced future herbivory. Additionally, the tendrils of perennial vine Cayratia japonica are more likely to coil around nearby plants of another species than nearby plants of the same species in natural and experimental settings. This ability, which has only been previously documented in roots, demonstrates the vine's ability to distinguish whether another plant is of the same species as itself or a different one.

In tendrilled vines, the tendrils are highly sensitive to touch and the coiling action is mediated by the hormones octadecanoids, jasmonates and indole-3-acetic acid. The touch stimulus and hormones may interact via volatile compounds or internal oscillation patterns. Research has found the presence of ion translocating ATPases in the Bryonia dioica species of plants, which has implications for a possible ion mediation tendril curling mechanism. In response to a touch stimulus, vanadate-sensitive K^{+}, Mg^{2+} ATPase and Ca^{2+}-translocating ATPases rapidly increase their activity. This increases transmembrane ion fluxes that appear to be involved in the early stages of tendril coiling.

== Example vine taxa ==
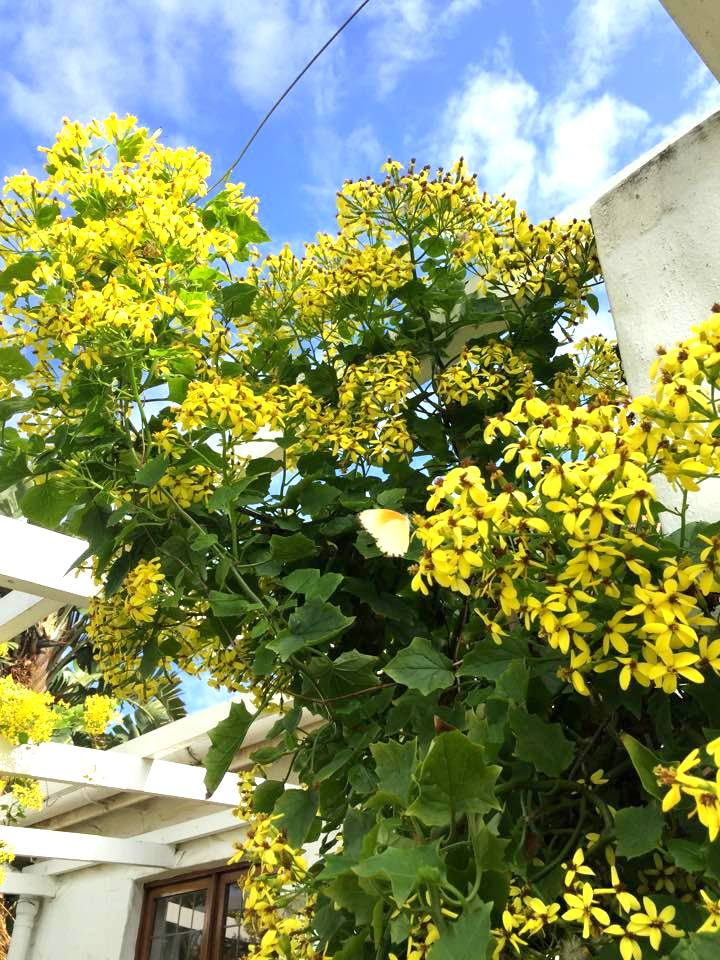
Canary creeper trailing on a trellis.

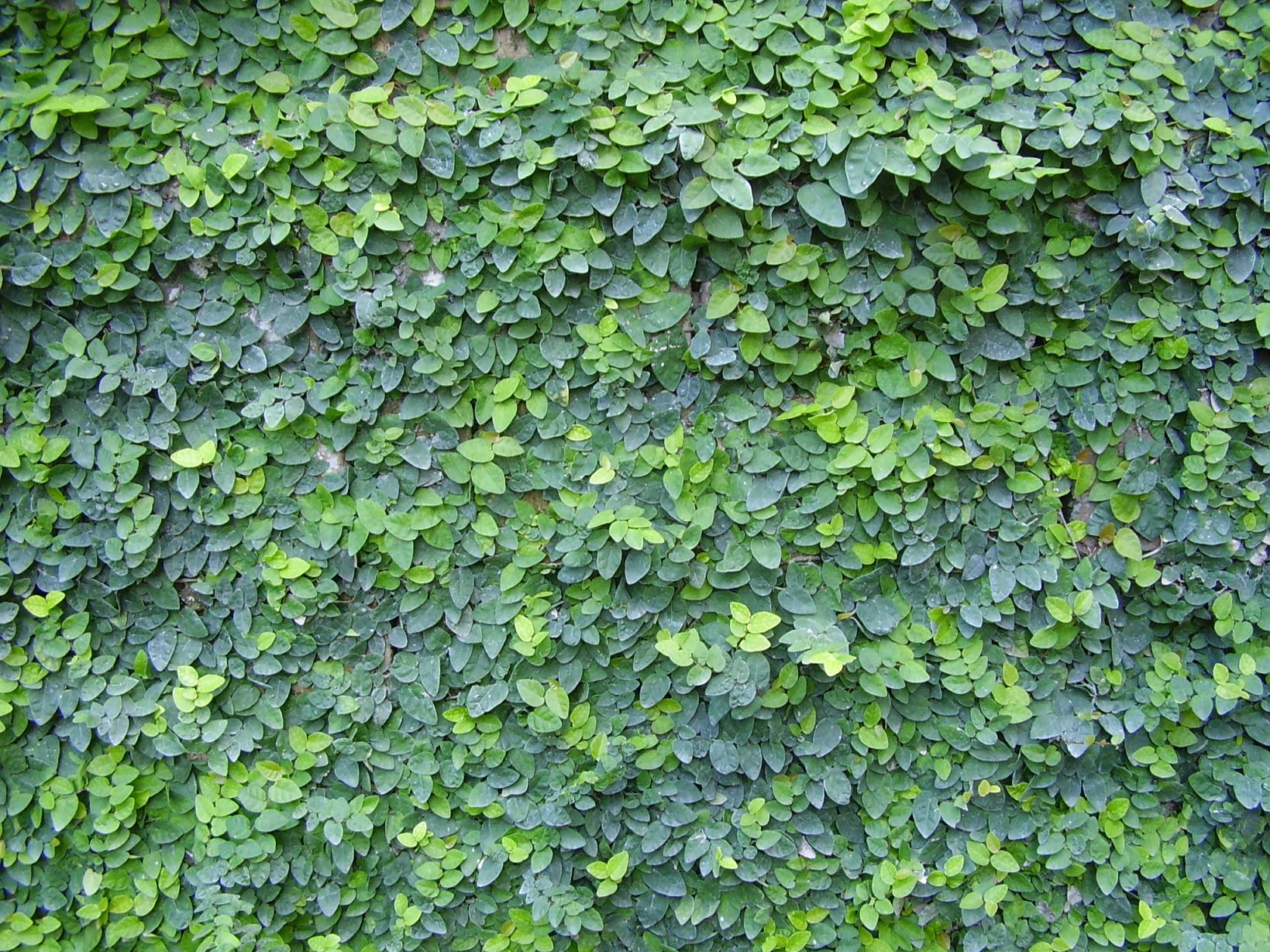
Ficus pumila's vigorous wall growth

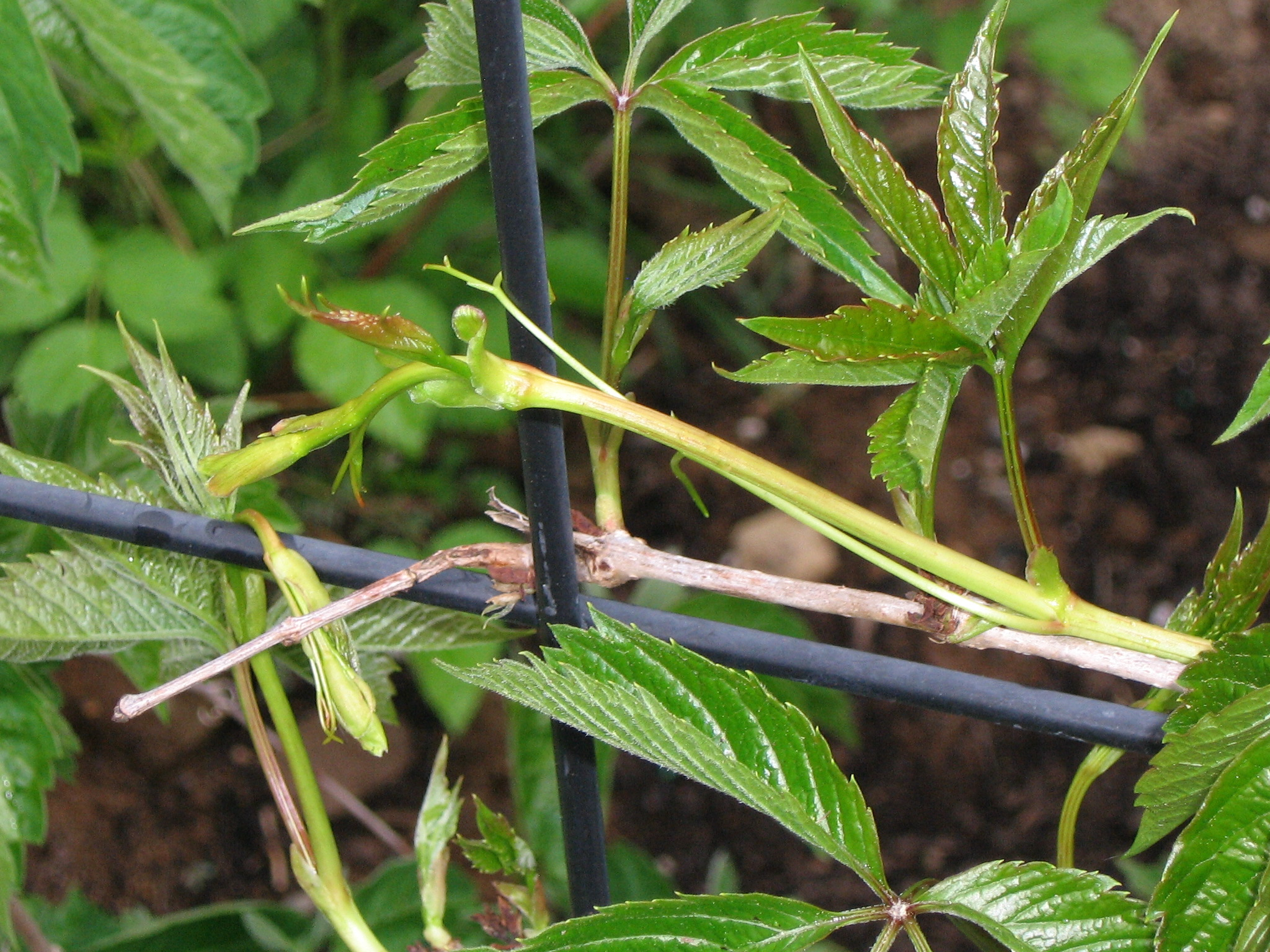
Spring growth of Virginia creeper

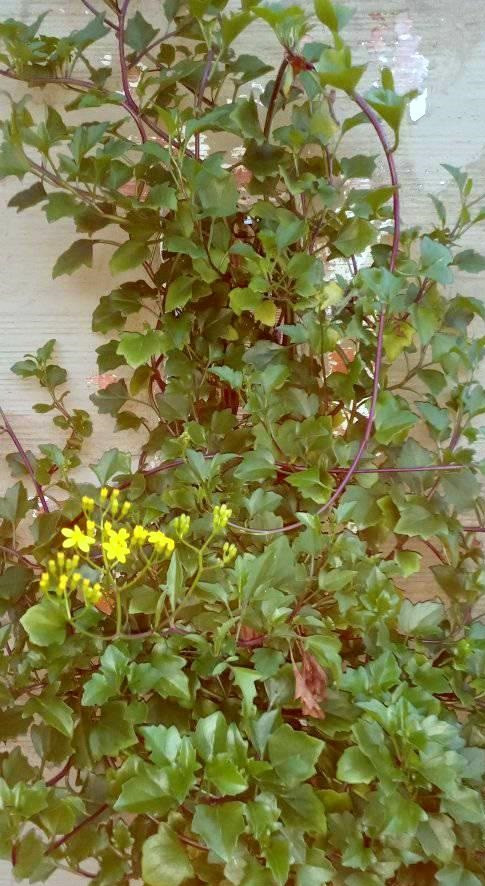
Scrambling habit of climbing groundsel.

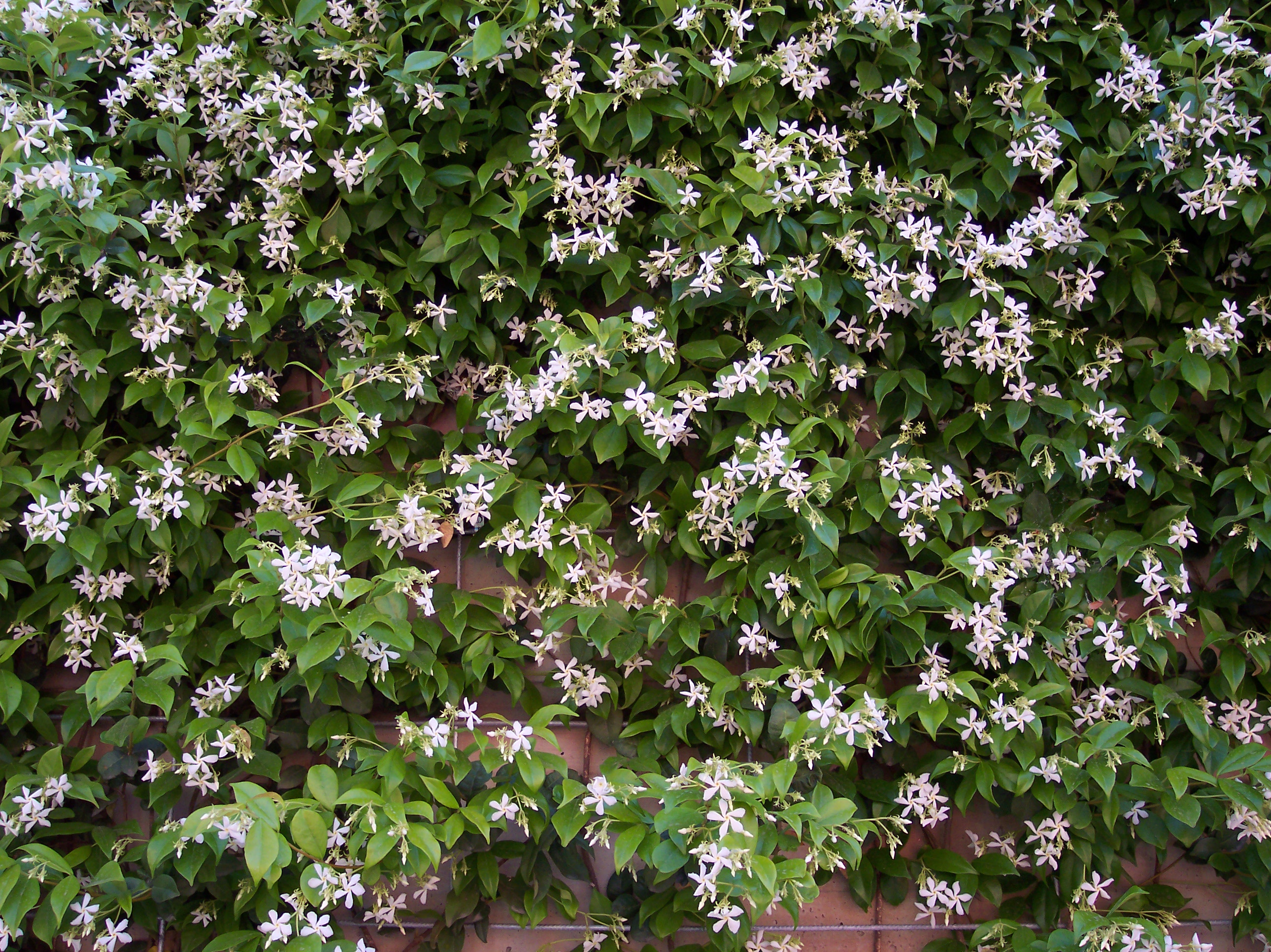
Confederate jasmine with flowers

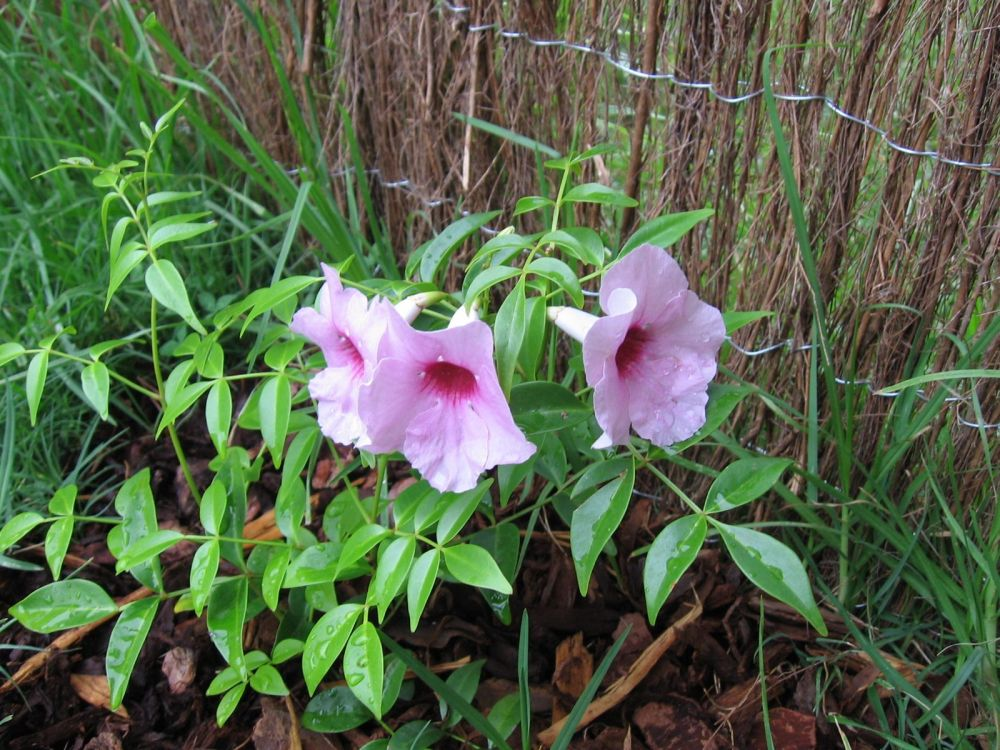
Bower vine's showy flowers

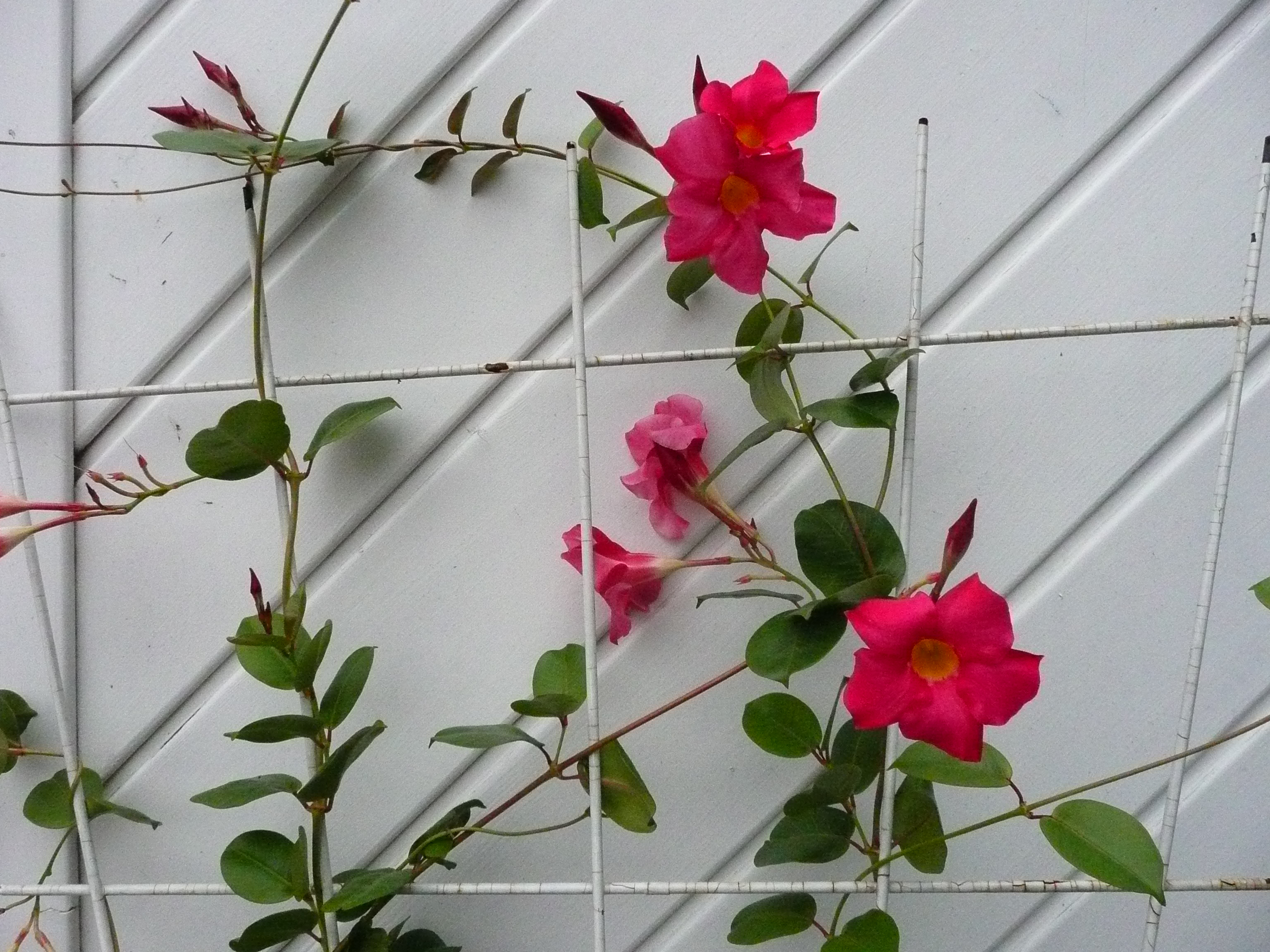
Mandevilla trailing on trellis

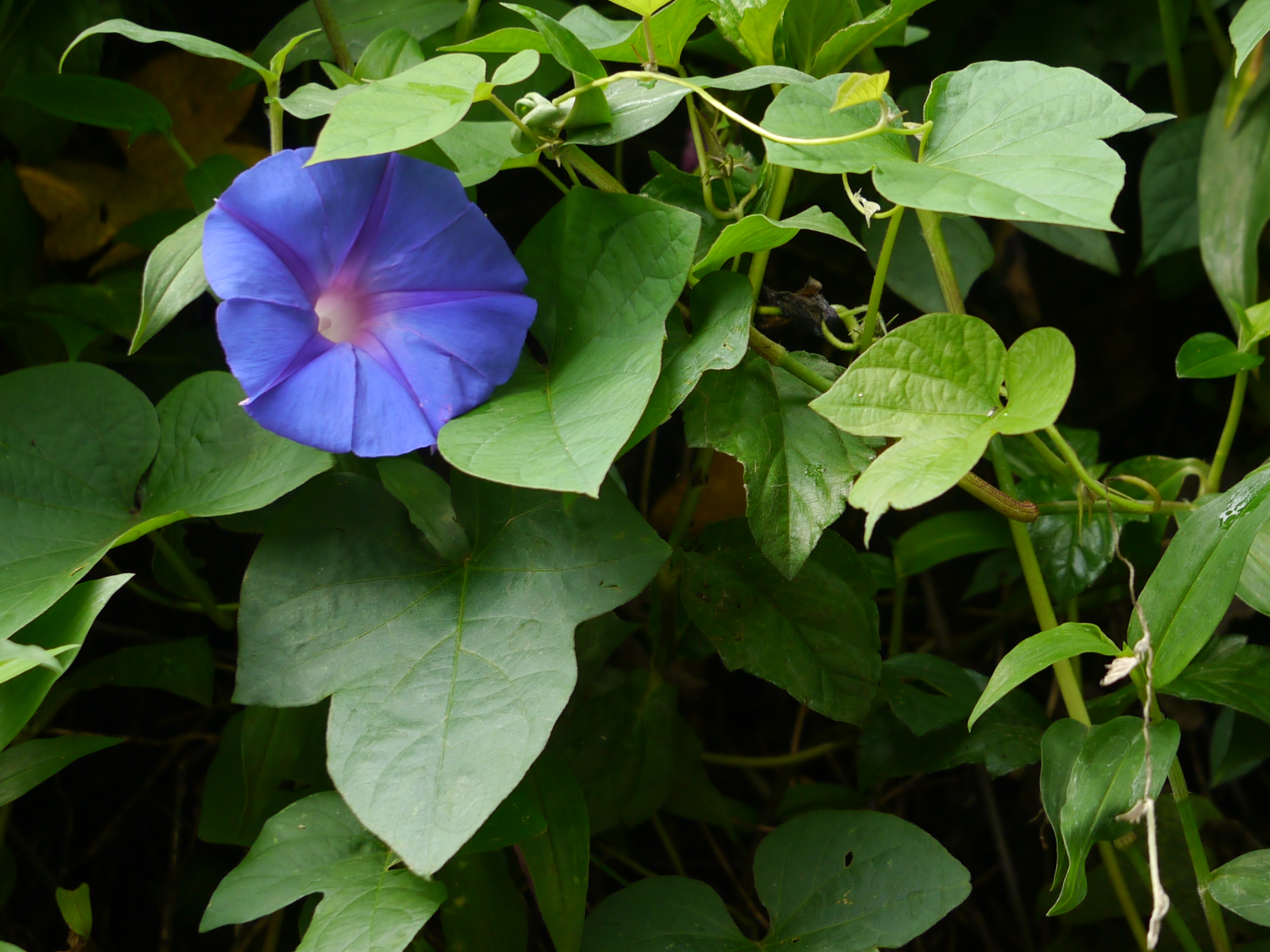
Oceanblue morning glory

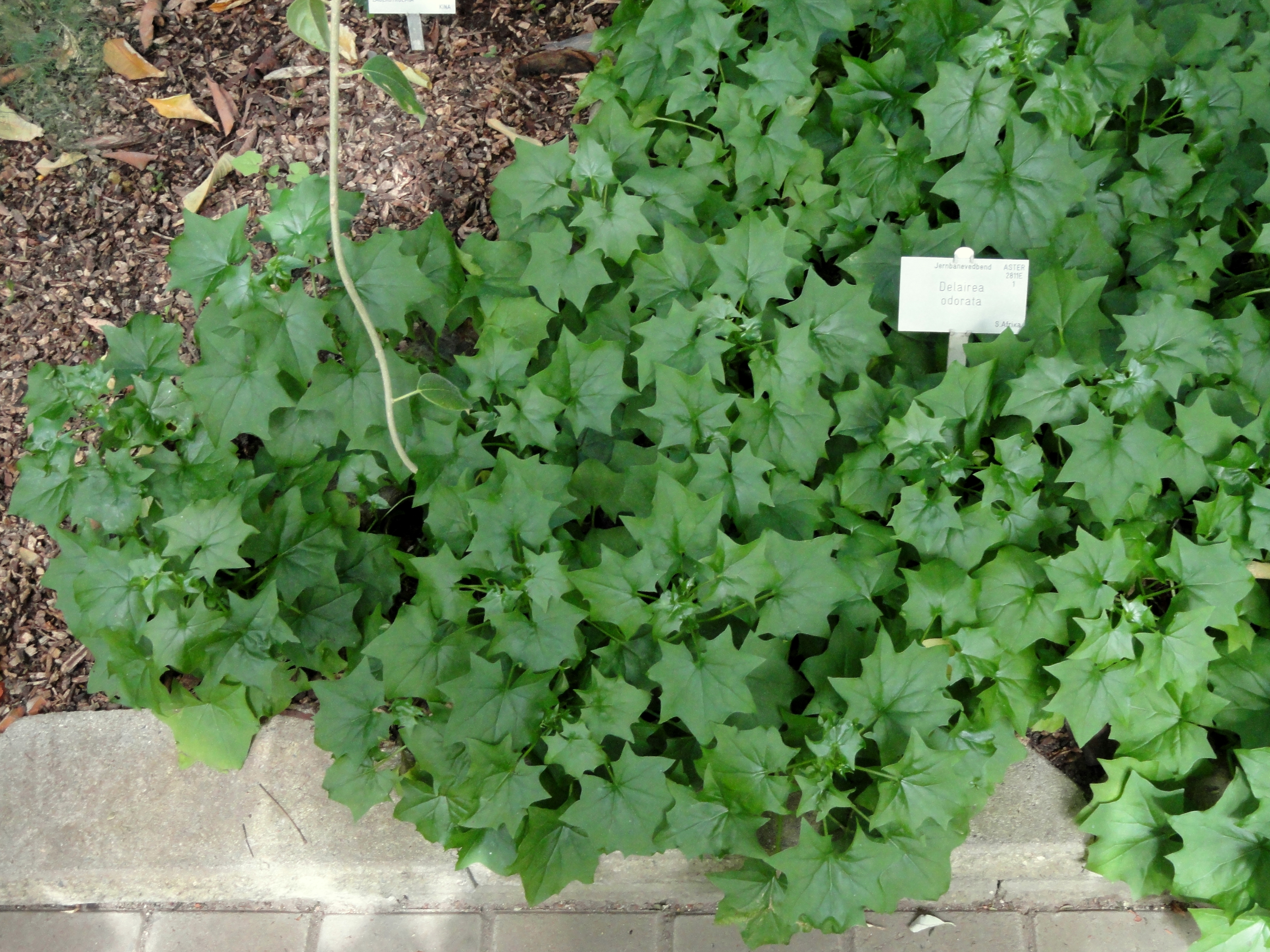
German ivy creeping on ground

- Actinidia, a genus in the Actinidiaceae family that includes edible fruiting vines, Actinidia chinensis var. deliciosa (kiwifruit vine), and A. arguta (hardy kiwifruit or kiwiberry vine), and cultivated ornamental vines A.kolomikta, and A. polygama (silver vine)
- Adlumia fungosa, the Allegheny vine
- Akebia, a genus of about 5 vines in the Lardizabalaceae family, including Akebia quinata, and A. trioliata (chocolate vines)
- Allamanda, a genus in the Apocynaceae family including the cultivated ornamental vines Allamanda cathartica (common or golden trumpet vine) and A. blanchetii
- Ampelocissus, a large genus in the Vitaceae family native to tropical and subtropical regions worldwide
- Ampelopsis, a genus of vines in the Vitaceae family native to Asia and North America known as porcelain berry or pepper vines, including the cultivated ornamental vines Ampelopsis glandulosa
- Anredera cordifolia, Madeira-vine
- Antigonon, the coral vine
- Antigonon leptopus, the Confederate vine
- Aptenia cordifolia, the heart-leaved aptenia
- Araujia sericifera, moth vine
- Asparagus asparagoides, bridal creeper, bridal-veil creeper
- Banisteriopsis caapi, ayahuasca, also known as caapi, yage, and soul vine
- Berchemia scandens, the rattan vine
- Bignonia, the cross vine
- Bougainvillea, a genus of thorny ornamental vines, bushes, and trees
- Callerya megasperma, native wisteria
- Calamus, rattan
- Convolvulus sepium, hedge bindweed
- Campsis, the trumpet vine
  - Campsis grandiflora, the Chinese trumpet vine
- Cardiospermum halicacabum, the balloon vine
- Celastrus, the staff vine
- Ceropegia woodii, string of hearts
- Clematis vitalba, traveller's joy
- Clerodendrum thomsoniae, bleeding-heart vine
- Clitoria ternatea, butterfly pea
- Ceropegia linearis, the rosary vine or sweetheart vine
- Cissus antarctica, the kangaroo vine
- Cissus hypoglauca, the water vine
- Citrullus lanatus var. lanatus, the watermelon
- Cobaea scandens, cup-and-saucer vine, cathedral bells, Mexican ivy
- Cochliasanthus, known as corkscrew vine, snail vine, snail creeper
- Cucumis sativus, the cucumber
- Cyphostemma juttae, known as wild grape
- Delairea odorata, German ivy
- Desmoncus, jacitara
- Dolichandra unguis-cati, cat's claw creeper, funnel creeper, or cat's claw trumpet
- Epipremnum aureum, known as golden pothos and devil's ivy
- Fallopia baldschuanica, the Russian vine
- Ficus pumila, known as the climbing fig
- Hardenbergia violacea, lilac vine
- Hedera helix, known as common ivy, English ivy, European ivy, or ivy
- Hibbertia scandens, climbing guinea flower, golden guinea vine, gold guinea plant
- Hoya, a genus of about 300 species of climbing or creeping plants
- Humulus lupulus, common hop
- Hydrangea petiolaris, climbing hydrangea
- Ipomoea, a genus of over 600 mostly climbing species and largest genus in the Convolvulaceae family. Ipomoea batatas (sweet potato) is widely cultivated for its edible, starchy roots. The sap of I. alba (moon vine) sap was used for vulcanization of the latex of Castilla elastica (Panama rubber tree). Many species are cultivated as ornamentals vines including I. cairica (coast morning glory), I. indica (blue morning glory), I. purpurea (purple morning glory), I. lobata (fire vine, Spanish flag vine), and I. tricolor
- Jasminum polyanthum, pink jasmine
- Kadsura japonica, kadsura vine
- Kennedia coccinea, the common coral vine
- Kennedia nigricans', black coral pea
- Lagenaria siceraria, known as the bottle gourd, calabash, opo squash, or long melon
- Lathyrus odoratus, the sweet pea
- Lonicera japonica, known as Suikazura or Japanese honeysuckle
- Luffa, a genus of tropical and subtropical vines classified in the cucumber family, Cucurbitaceae
- Lygodium, a genus of about 40 species of ferns, known as climbing ferns
- Mandevilla, rocktrumpet, Brazilian jasmine
- Momordica charantia, the bitter gourd
- Mikania scandens, the hemp vine
- Muehlenbeckia adpressa, the macquarie vine
- Nepenthes, a genus of carnivorous plants known as tropical pitcher plants or monkey cups
- Pandorea jasminoides, bower vine
- Pandorea pandorana, the wonga wonga vine
- Parthenocissus is a genus of deciduous vines in the Vitaceae family, native to Asia and North America. Several species are cultivated as ornamental vines, including P. henryana, (Chinese Virginia-creeper), P. quinquefolia (Virginia creeper), and P. tricuspidata (Boston ivy, Japanese ivy)
- Passiflora is a large genus of about 550 species in the Passifloraceae, with the vast majority being tendril-bearing vines. Some species are cultivated for their edible fruit (passion fruit) with Passiflora edulis (maracujá) the most important species commercially, but other edible species include P. ligularis and P. quadrangularis (granadilla), P. tripartita and P. tarminiana. Many species and hybrids are also grown as ornamentals for their flowers.
- Periploca graeca, the silk vine
- Philodendron hederaceum, heartleaf philodendron
- Piper betle. betel vine
- Podranea ricasoliana, the pink trumpet vine
- Pueraria lobata, the kudzu vine
- Pyrostegia venusta, flamevine or orange trumpet vine
- Pseudogynoxys chenopodioides, Mexican flamevine
- Rosa banksiae, Lady Banks' rose
- Rosa filipes, climbing rose
- Schizophragma, hydrangea vine
- Scindapsus pictus, the silver vine
- Sechium edule, known as chayote, christophene, or several other names
- Senecio angulatus, known as Cape ivy
- Solandra, a genus of flowering plants in the nightshade family
- Solanum laxum, the potato vine
- Stephania japonica, snake vine
- Stephanotis floribunda, known as Madagascar jasmine
- Strongylodon macrobotrys, the jade vine
- Syngonium, the goosefoot vine
  - Syngonium podophyllum, the arrowhead vine
- Thunbergia alata, black-eyed Susan
- Thunbergia grandiflora, known as the Bengal clock vine or blue trumpet vine
- Thunbergia erecta, the bush clock vine
- Toxicodendron radicans, known as poison ivy
- Trachelospermum asiaticum, Asiatic jasmine
- Trachelospermum jasminoides, Confederate jasmine, star jasmine
- Vitis, any of about sixty species of grape
- Wisteria, a genus of flowering plants in the pea family
- Xerosicyos, silver dollar vine

== See also ==
- Vine (disambiguation)
- Liana, any of various long-stemmed, woody vines
- Nutation (botany), bending and growth patterns of plants, which dictate the growth of vines.
- On the Movements and Habits of Climbing Plants, by Charles Darwin
- Vine training systems
