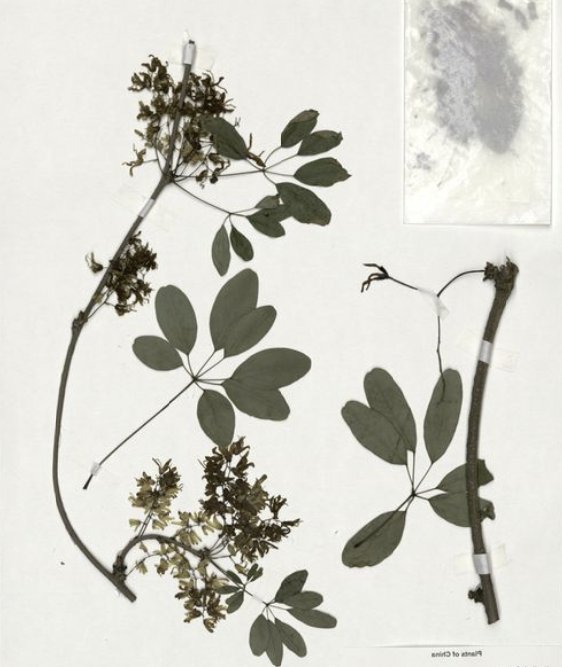

Scientific classification
- Kingdom: Plantae
- Clade: Tracheophytes
- Clade: Angiosperms
- Clade: Eudicots
- Order: Ranunculales
- Family: Lardizabalaceae
- Genus: Akebia
- Species: A. apetala

Binomial name
- Akebia apetala (Quan Xia, J.Z.Sun & Z.X.Peng) Christenh.

= Akebia apetala =

Species of plant

Akebia apetala is a species of flowering plant in the Lardizabalaceae family. It has only been found in Northwestern China.

== Description ==
Akebia apetala has woody climbing vines with grayish brown steams. Leaflets come in 5 - 7, obovate-elliptic to oblong, 3--7.5 × 1.5--4 cm, described as less than leathery, almost papery and dark green. The fruit is yellow, ellipsoid to oblong with a smooth outer surface rind. The fruit splits open at maturity revealing the inner flesh.
