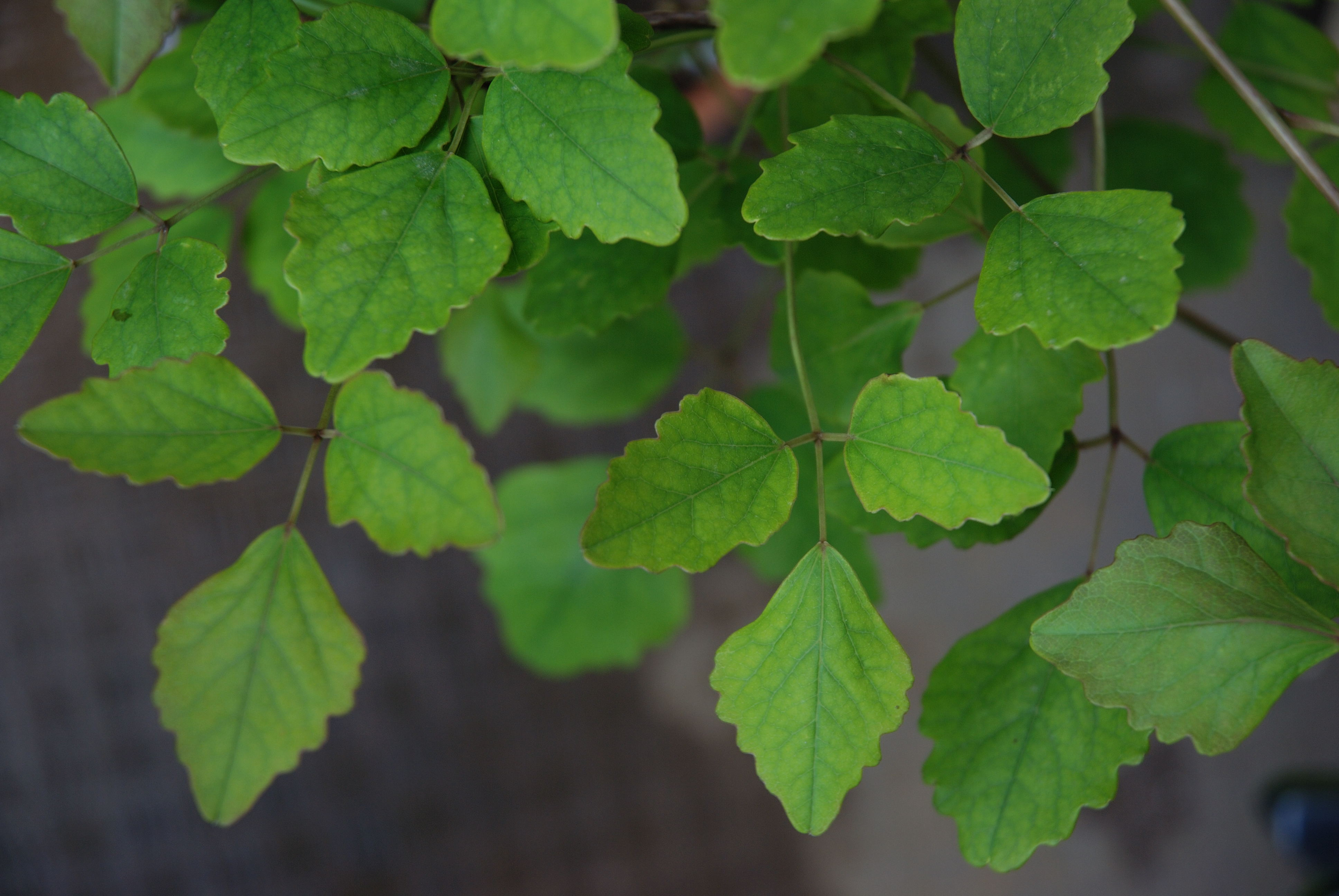

Scientific classification
- Kingdom: Plantae
- Clade: Embryophytes
- Clade: Tracheophytes
- Clade: Spermatophytes
- Clade: Angiosperms
- Clade: Eudicots
- Order: Ranunculales
- Family: Lardizabalaceae
- Genus: Akebia
- Species: A. trifoliata

Binomial name
- Akebia trifoliata (Thunb.) Koidz

= Akebia trifoliata =

Species of plant

Akebia trifoliata also known as chocolate vine, three leaf chocolate vine or three leaf akebia, is a species of flowering plant. It is a close relative of the more commonly known Akebia quinata.

== Description ==
Akebia trifoliata is a climbing vine with leaves composed of three ovate, slightly lobed leaflets, often bronze-tinted when young. It grows up to 9.1 m (30 ft) long. It loses its leaves in cold climates, but the twining woody branches are handsome even when bare. Flowers are deep purple in short racemes and followed by light purple fruits.

Like Akebia quinata, it grows in USDA hardiness zones from 5a to 9b: from −20 °F (−28.9 °C) to 30 °F (−1.1 °C).

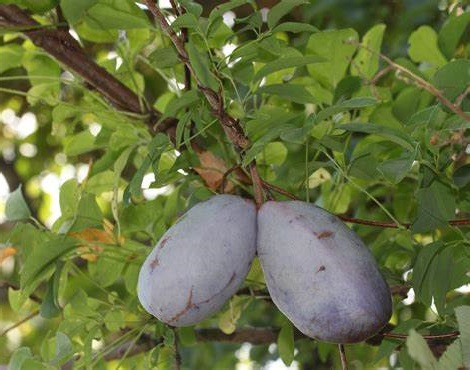
The smaller oblong fruit of A. trifoliata

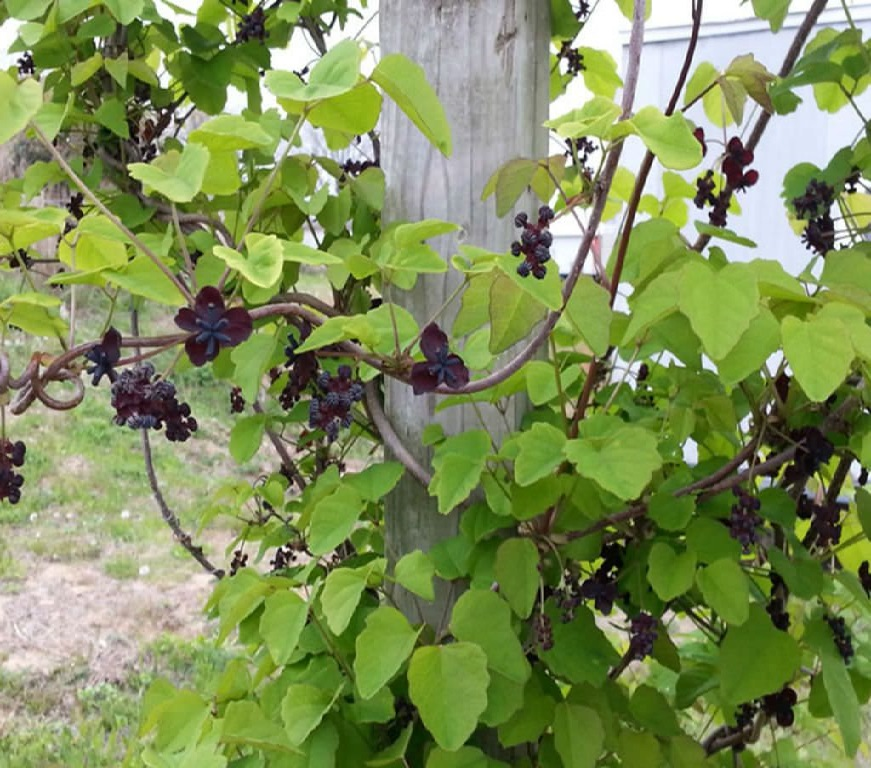
Akebia trifoliata foliage with its iconic chocolate-colored flowers

== Uses ==
=== Culinary uses ===
The plant is grown for its ornamental appeal but also for the edible oblong purplish fruits. The fruit itself has a mild flavor reminiscent of coconut or tapioca and is considered quite sweet. It has a mild melon flavor when eaten ripe

=== Medicinal uses ===
It is used in traditional Chinese medicine to help with urinary tract infections and "quickening blood flow."

Extracts of the fruits have been shown to have diuretic properties (reduction of water-weight), hepato-regenerative, neuroprotective, analgesic, anti-inflammatory, and anti-obesity effects. It has been shown to help with weight loss in vitro and reduction of fat deposition.

The rind, though inedible, has been found to contain a high concentration of cancer fighting antioxidants which can be extracted by making a tea out of the rind.

Akebia trifoliata also has been used to create an "antibacterial pectin" from its waste products which may increase the profitability of the plant when grown commercially.

== Gallery ==
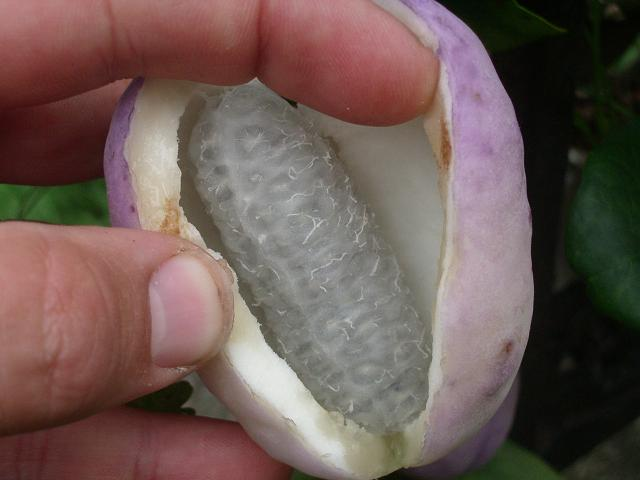
Fruit of Akebia trifoliata with hand for scale

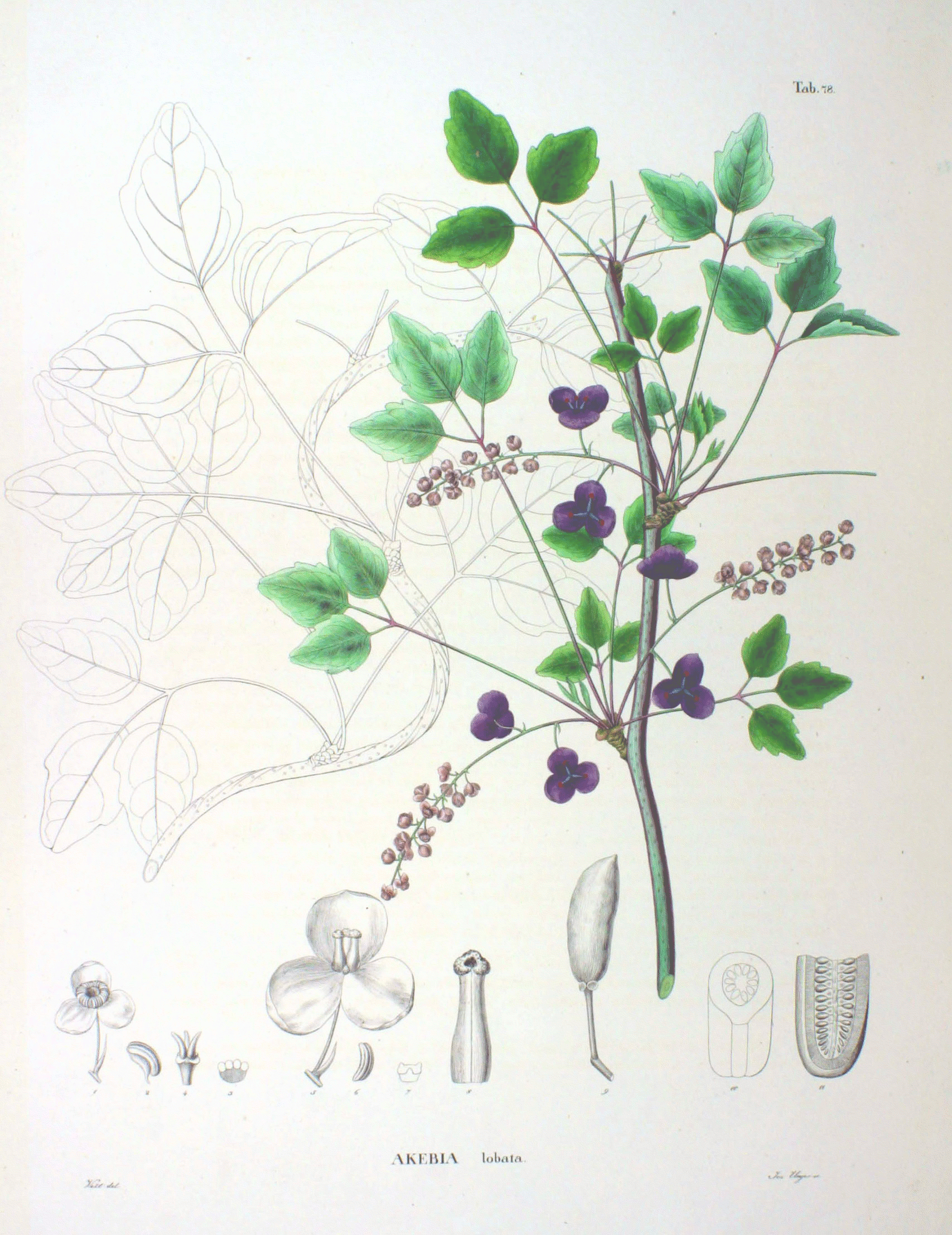
Botanical illustration of Akebia trifoliata
