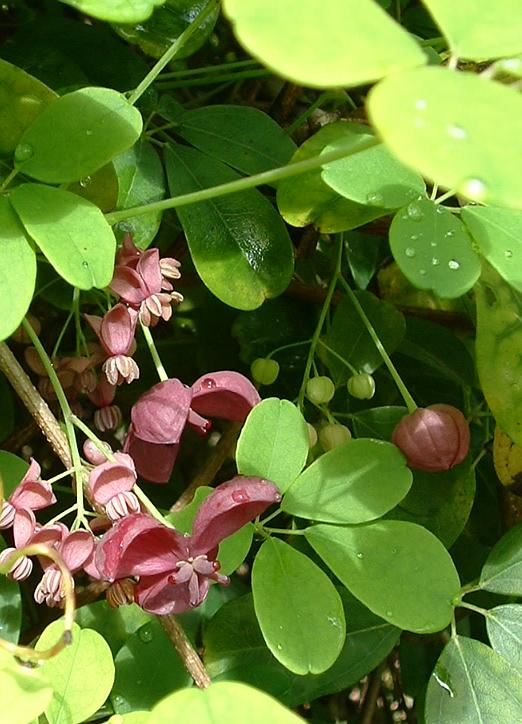
- Akebia quinata

Scientific classification
- Kingdom: Plantae
- Clade: Embryophytes
- Clade: Tracheophytes
- Clade: Angiosperms
- Clade: Eudicots
- Order: Ranunculales
- Family: Lardizabalaceae
- Genus: Akebia; Decne. (1837)

Species
- 5, see text

Synonyms
- Archakebia C.Y.Wu, T.C.Chen & H.N.Qin (1995)

= Akebia =

Genus of flowering plant

Akebia is a genus of five species of flowering plant, within the family Lardizabalaceae.

Akebia quinata is the most well known species as a minor invader in the majority of the American East Coast and some states in the West Coast.

== Taxonomy ==
The scientific name, akebia, is a Latinization of akebi (通草), the Japanese name for the species A. quinata.

=== Species ===
There are five species:

| Flower | Name | Common name | Distribution |
|---|---|---|---|
| | Akebia apetala (Quan Xia, J.Z.Sun & Z.X.Peng) Christenh. | | China, Japan, Korea, and Taiwan |
| | Akebia chingshuiensis T. Shimizu | | Taiwan |
| | Akebia longeracemosa Matsumura | Long Racemed Akebia | China and Taiwan |
| | Akebia quinata (Houttuyn) Decaisne | Chocolate vine or five-leaf akebia | China, Korea and Japan |
| | Akebia trifoliata (Thunberg) Koidzumi | Three-leaf akebia | China, Korea and Japan |

== Hybrids ==
- Akebia × pentaphylla (Makino) Makino (A. quinata × A. trifoliata)

== Fruit ==
Akebia quinata and Akebia trifoliata both bear edible fruit, containing a sweet white flesh. Flavor varies greatly in akebias, even within the same species, with some individuals displaying a complex flavor profile resembling a mixture of banana, passionfruit and lychee, with others being mild, or even insipid (flavorless).

== Akebia in Japan ==
Akebia is often mentioned in Japanese literature, where it is evocative of pastoral settings. Although the akebi commonly refers to the five-leafed species, the three-leafed species is used in much the same way for novelty food, medicine, and for vine material.

While only a minor food eaten while foraging in the past, akebia is considered a specialty crop today, only available when in season. The pods contain a white, semi-translucent gelatinous pulp that is mildly sweet and full of seeds. The taste is described as sweet but rather "insipid". Some people recollect in idyllic terms how they foraged for it in the hills as children.

The purple-colored, slightly bitter rind has been used as a vegetable in Yamagata Prefecture or in those northern areas, where the typical recipe calls for stuffing the rind with minced chicken (or pork) flavored with miso. Minor quantities of akebia are shipped to the urban market as a novelty vegetable.

In addition to consuming the fruit, akebia leaves are also made into a tea infusion. Outside of food and drinks, akebia vines are used for basket-weaving crafts. An old source lists Minakuchi, Shiga and Tsugaru (now Aomori Prefecture) as localities that produced baskets from the vines of trifoliate variety.

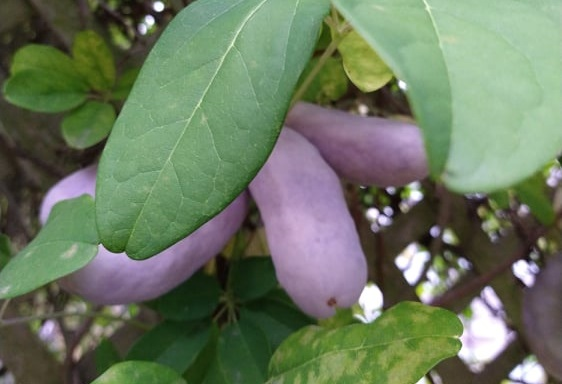
Akebia fruit growing in western Washington

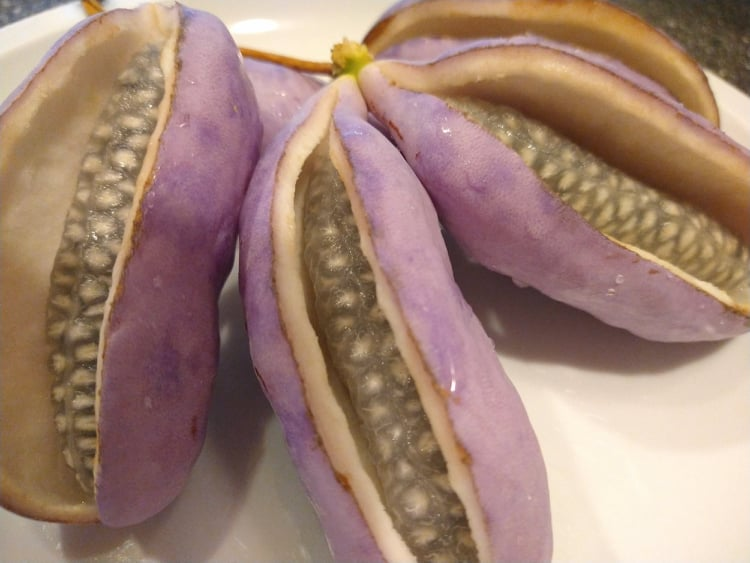
Ripe Akebia quinata grown in Washington state

== Gallery ==
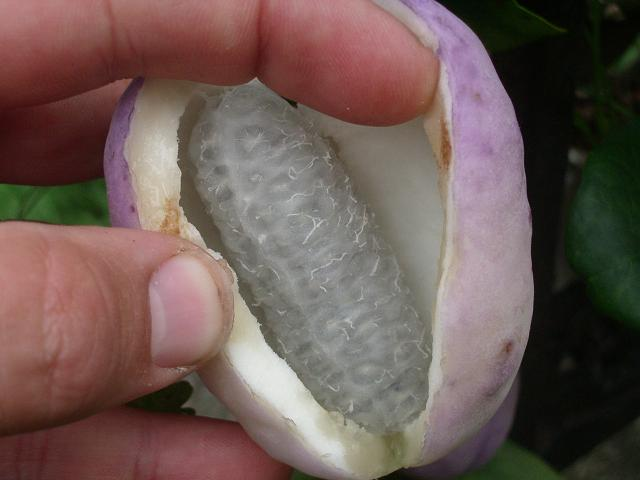
Ripe Akebia trifoliata fruit

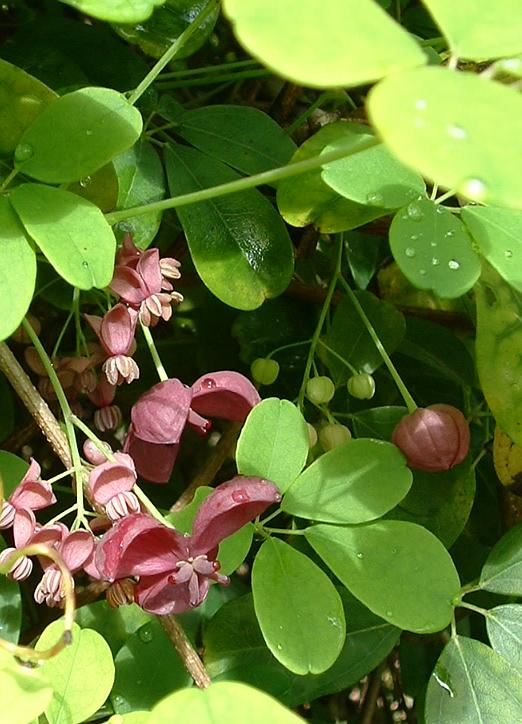
Akebia quinata leaves and flowers

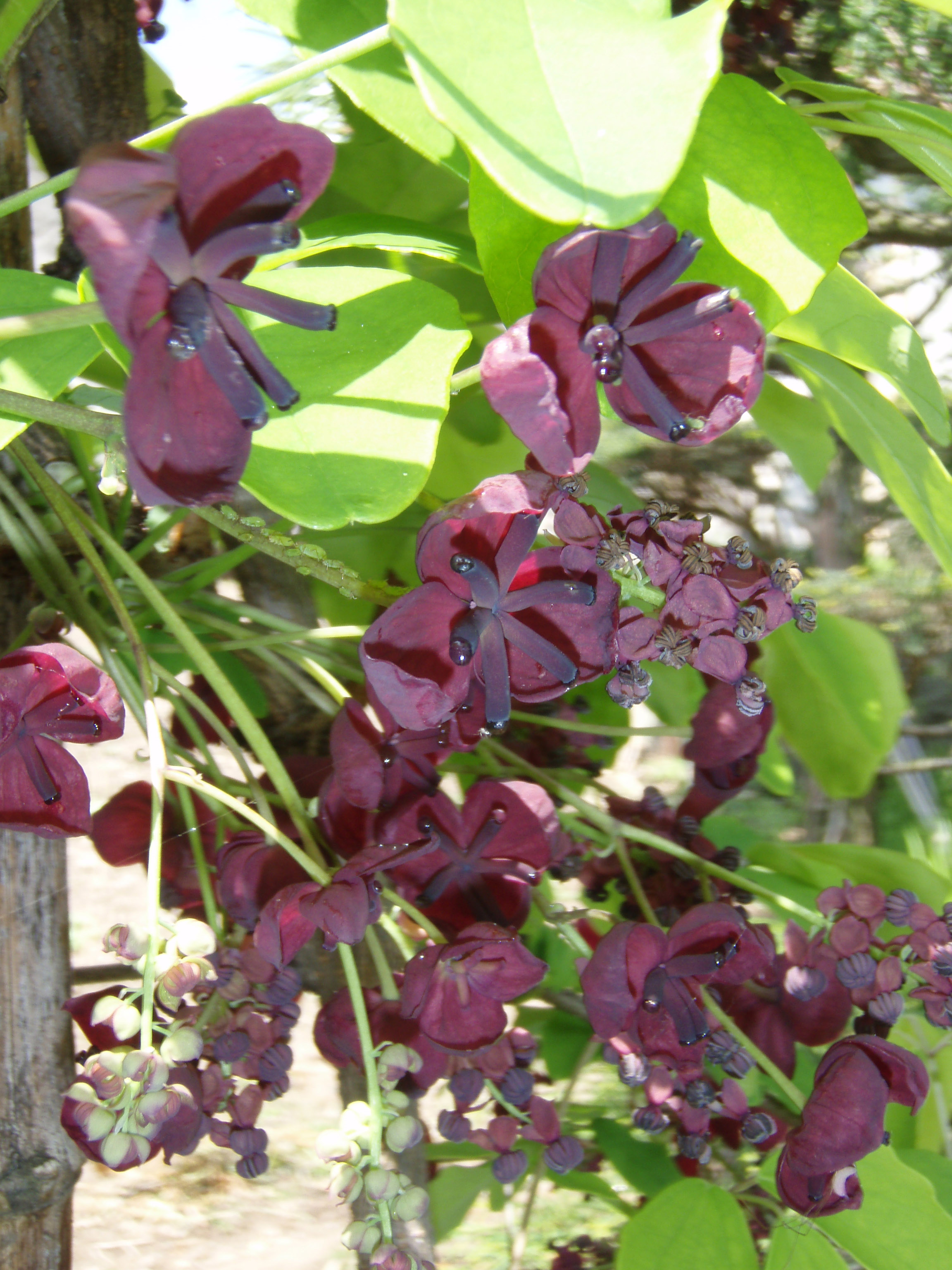
Female flowers of Akebia quinata (large) and male (small)

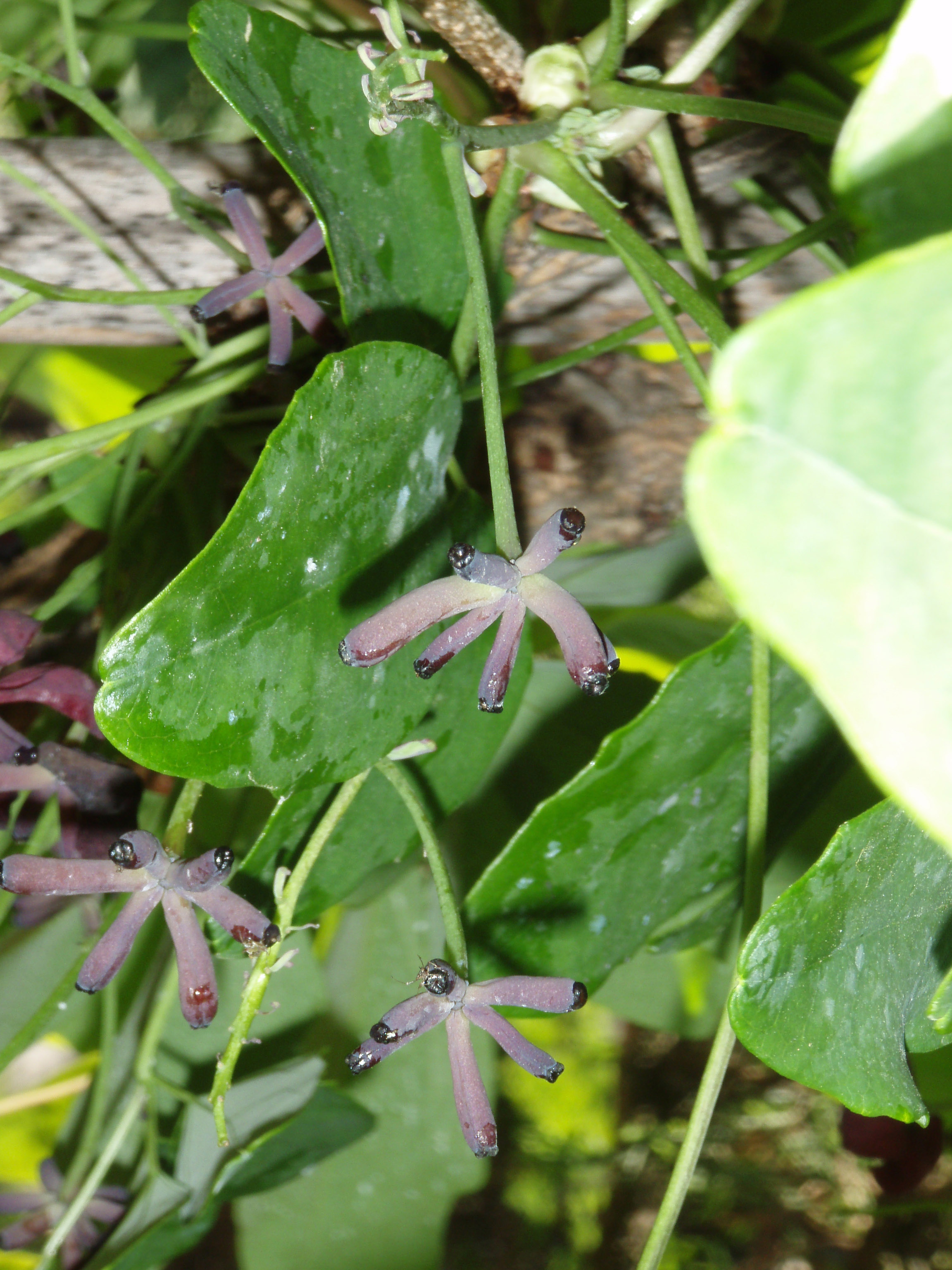
Early fruit of Akebia quinata

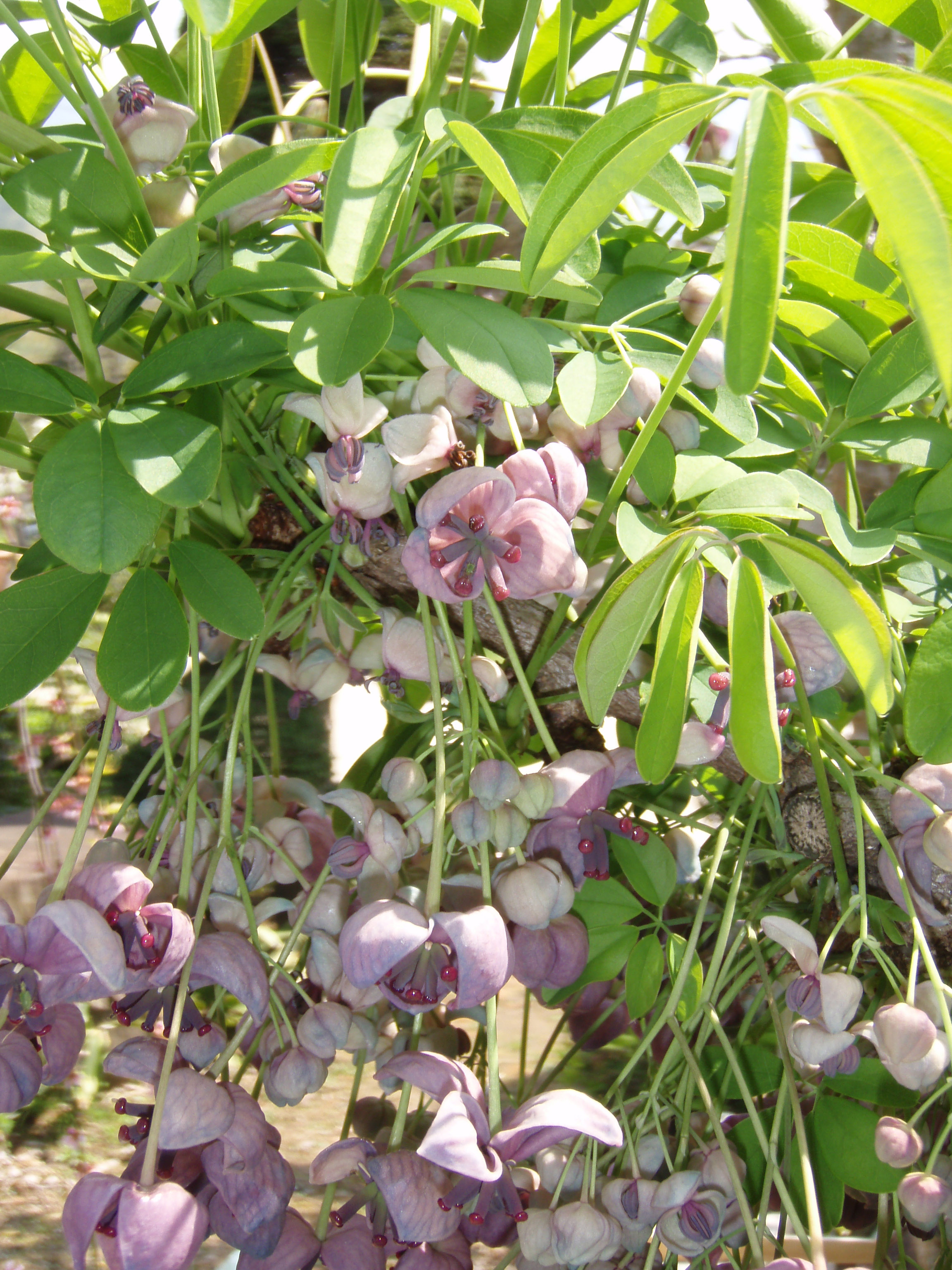
Akebia quinata flower

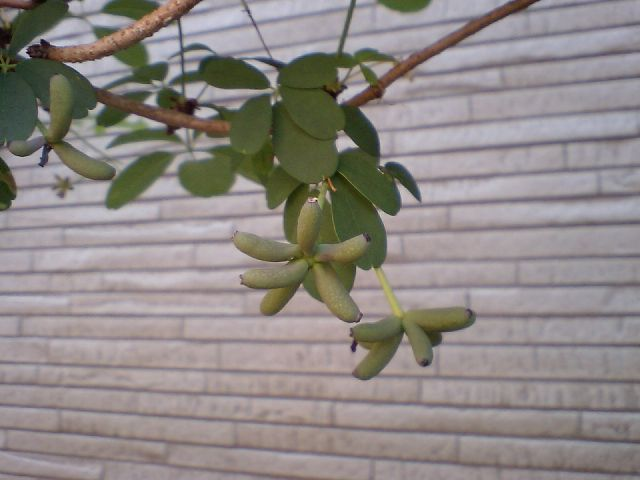
Early fruit of Akebia quinata

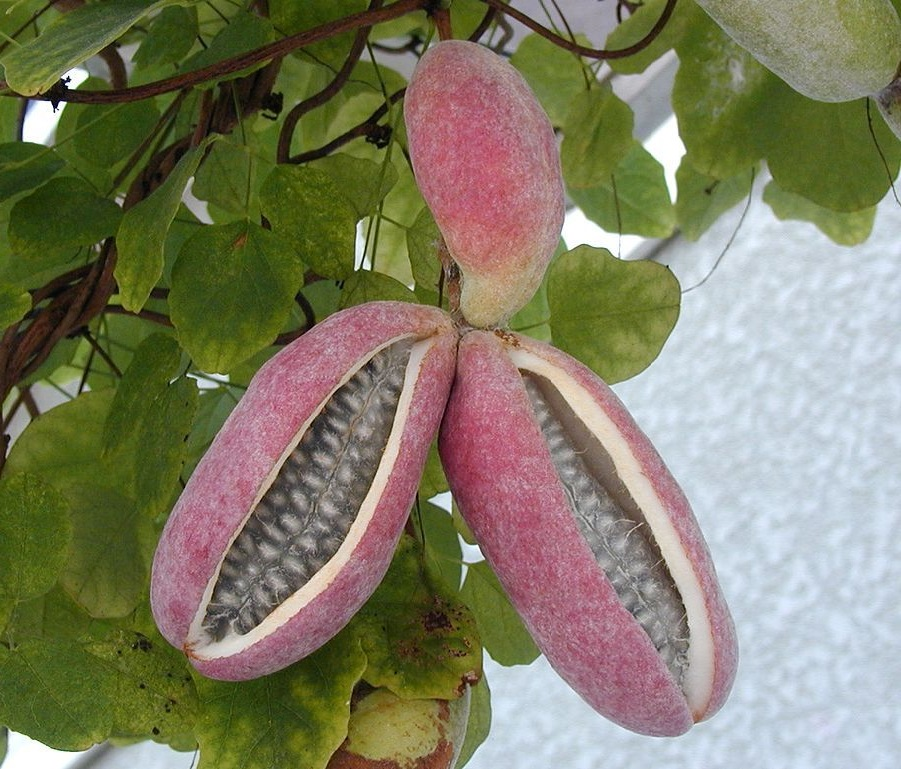
Pinker more magenta fruits of an A. quinata

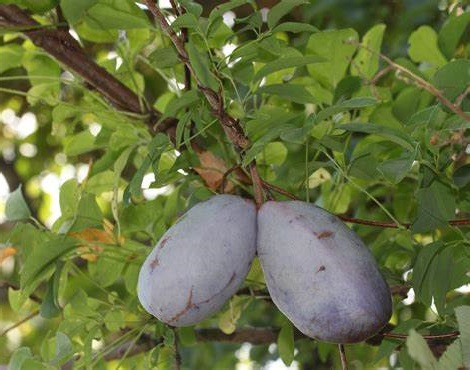
Bluish variety of A. trifoliata
