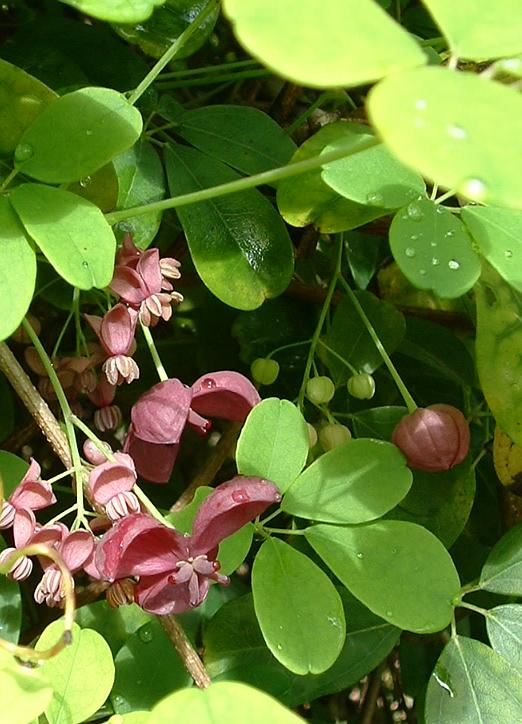

Scientific classification
- Kingdom: Plantae
- Clade: Tracheophytes
- Clade: Angiosperms
- Clade: Eudicots
- Order: Ranunculales
- Family: Lardizabalaceae
- Genus: Akebia
- Species: A. quinata

Binomial name
- Akebia quinata (Houtt.) Decne.

Synonyms
- Rajania quinata Houtt.

= Akebia quinata =

Species of plant

Akebia quinata –commonly known as akebi (木通), chocolate vine, five-leaf chocolate vine, or five-leaf akebia– is a vine that is native to Japan, China and Korea, commonly used as an ornamental or edible plant in the United States and Europe. In its native habitat, it is often found on hills, in hedges, on trees, along forest edges and streams, and on mountainous slopes.

== Etymology ==
Akebi, its Japanese vernacular name, was originally written as 開(あ)け実(び); it derives from akeru (開ける, "to open") and mi (実, "fruit"), due to its fruit splitting open when ripe.

The epithet quinata means 'divided into five' and is presumably a reference to its lobed leaves.

== Description ==
Akebia quinata is a climbing evergreen vine that grows to 10 m (30 ft) or more in height and has palmately compound leaves with five elliptic or obovate leaflets that are notched at the tip. The woody stems are greyish-brown with lenticels.

The flowers are clustered in racemes and are chocolate-scented, with three or four sepals. The fruits are sausage-shaped pods which contain edible pulp. The gelatinous placentation contains seeds surrounded with white pulp that has a sweet flavor.

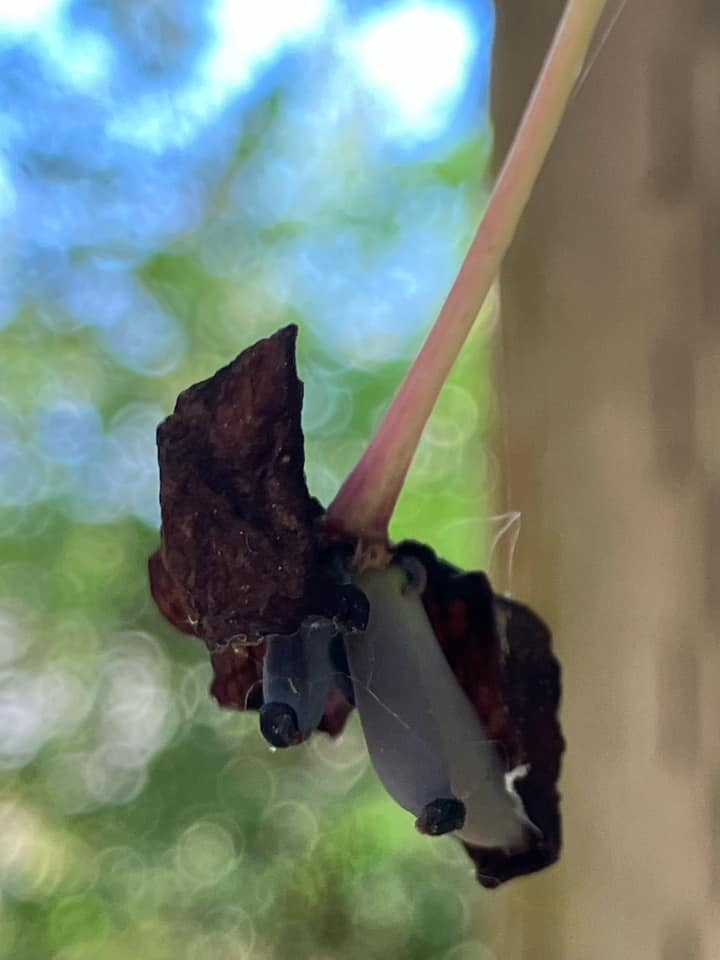
Young fruit of Akebia forming

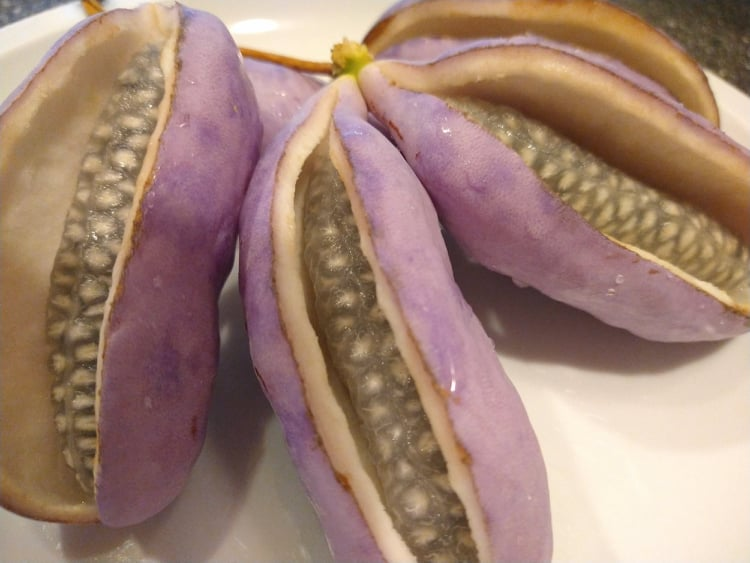
Ripe flesh of Akebia quinata fruit grown in Washington State

== Uses ==
=== Culinary ===
The fruit contains a sweet soft pulp, eaten primarily in Japan as a seasonal delicacy. The rind, with a slight bitter taste, is used as vegetable, fried and stuffed with ground meat or mushrooms.

Often eaten fresh, the Akebia fruit is best after it fully opens naturally on the vine. The fruiting season is from September to October. The seeds are very bitter and can even lead to throat irritation if chewed. They are discarded by spitting out or simply swallowing them whole. The fruit can be processed into jams, jellies, drinks and even added to smoothies or ice-creams.

=== Ornamental ===
Akebia quinata is often grown as an ornamental plant in the United States, Canada, Europe and Asia. It is primarily used to cover less attractive spots on the sides of businesses or a ground cover to prevent erosion of hills. The flowers bloom generally in April - May and produce a "chocolatey" aroma which is often compared to vanilla or sometimes nutmeg rather than chocolate.

Various breeders of the plant have created new subspecies with their own unique colored flowers. One of these is the "Silver Bells" Akebia which has silvery white flowers with purple stamen. (see photo in Gallery)

=== Medicinal ===
Akebia quinata consumption has been shown in-vitro to lower cholesterol levels present in the blood of rodents.

The stem contains approximately 30% potassium salts thus causing a diuretic action.

The fruit is used in traditional Chinese medicine to treat urinary tract infections, scanty lactation, and rheumatoid arthritis.

=== Other ===
The dried rinds have been used in Japanese fertility festivals and due to their vulva-like appearance it is thought to increase the fertility of women, although there is no scientific evidence to support these claims.

== Cultivation ==
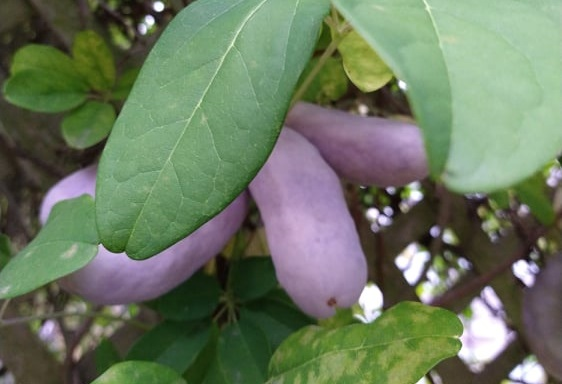
A bunch of Akebia fruit growing on a vine in western Washington)

Akebia prefers sandy soils with good drainage, and regular watering, though it is drought resistant. In some areas the plant is an invasive species to be avoided. This species is considered hardy in all of Europe (down to −15 to −20 °C). In the US, it suitable for hardiness zones 4–9.

Akebia quinata, and all Akebia species for that matter, will only produce fruit if pollinated by a genetically different plant (e.g., male flowers from the mother plant or the male flowers from a clone of the mother plant will not be able to pollinate the female flowers). Two separate varieties or two Akebia grown from separate seeds are needed to produce the sausage-like fruits.

== Distribution ==
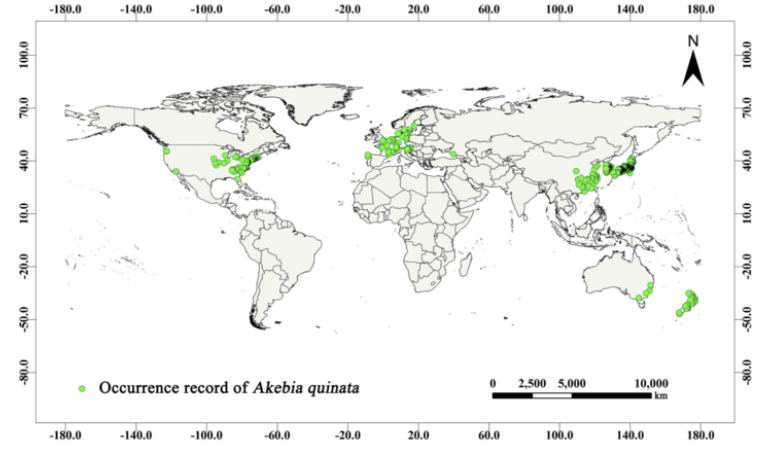
Range of Akebia quinata worldwide (only includes reports confirmed by botanists.) Potential numbers may far exceed what is shown in this map.

=== Native range ===
Akebia quinata is native to China, Japan (all major islands except Hokkaido) and the Korean Peninsula, but is cultivated globally. This map represents sightings of both wild and cultivated plants.

=== In North America ===
Akebia quinata is an invasive species in the majority of the East Coast and was introduced in 1845 as an ornamental plant. This is because the plant has no natural predators or diseases in North America and can grow as it pleases. Its shade tolerance and ability to endure full sun allow it to adapt to nearly all conditions it is grown in, and it will smother native shrubs and trees by blocking sunlight. In the East Coast, Akebia quinata has been reported in, Florida, Georgia, Alabama, Louisiana, Tennessee, South Carolina, North Carolina, Missouri, Kentucky, Virginia, West Virginia, Ohio, Indiana, Illinois, Delaware, Maryland, Pennsylvania, New Jersey, New York, Massachusetts, Vermont, Connecticut, Rhode Island, and as far north as Michigan and Wisconsin. On the west coast, it has been reported in the states of Washington and Oregon.

== Gallery ==
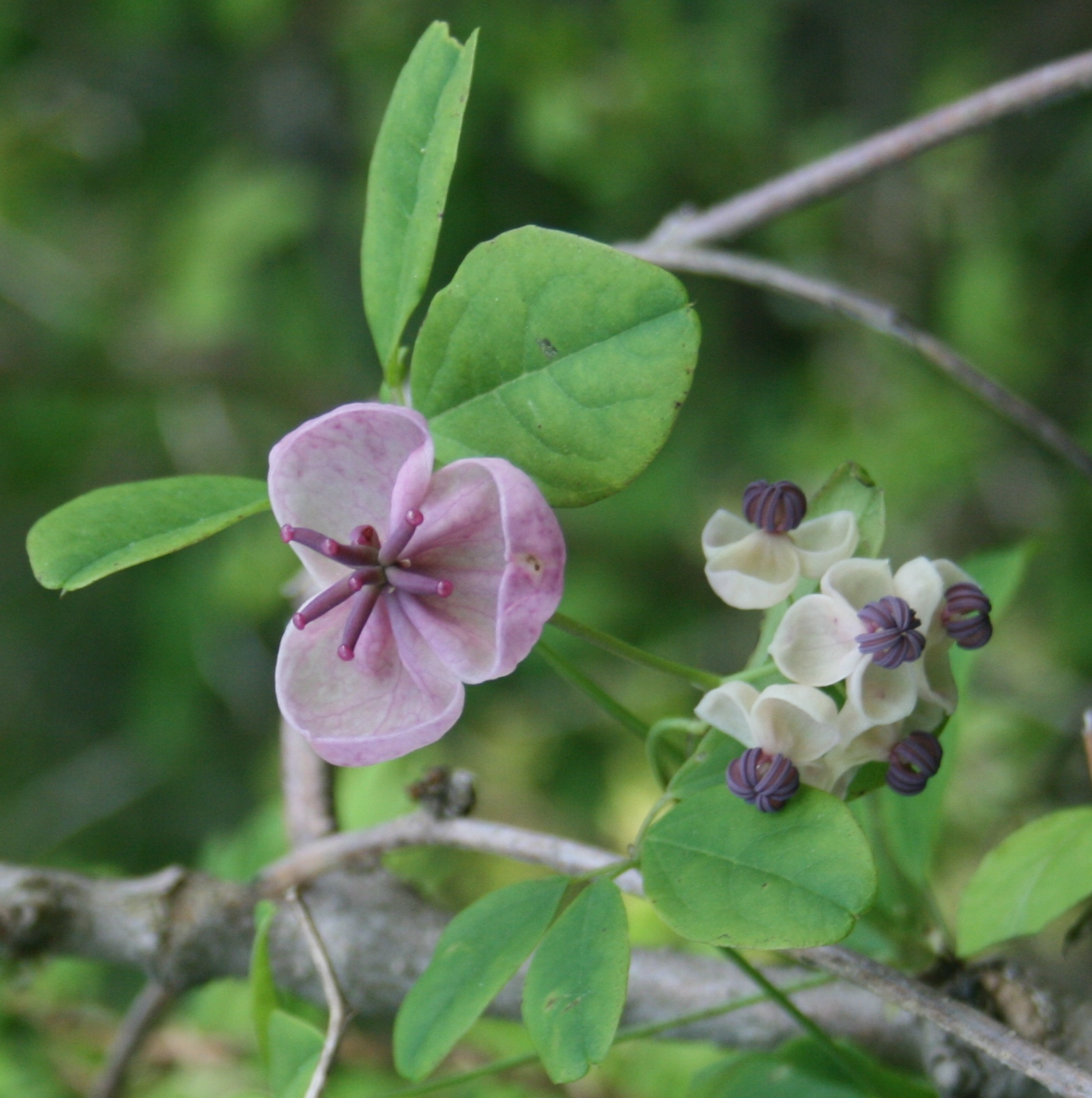
Female flower and 5 male flowers in Mount Ibuki

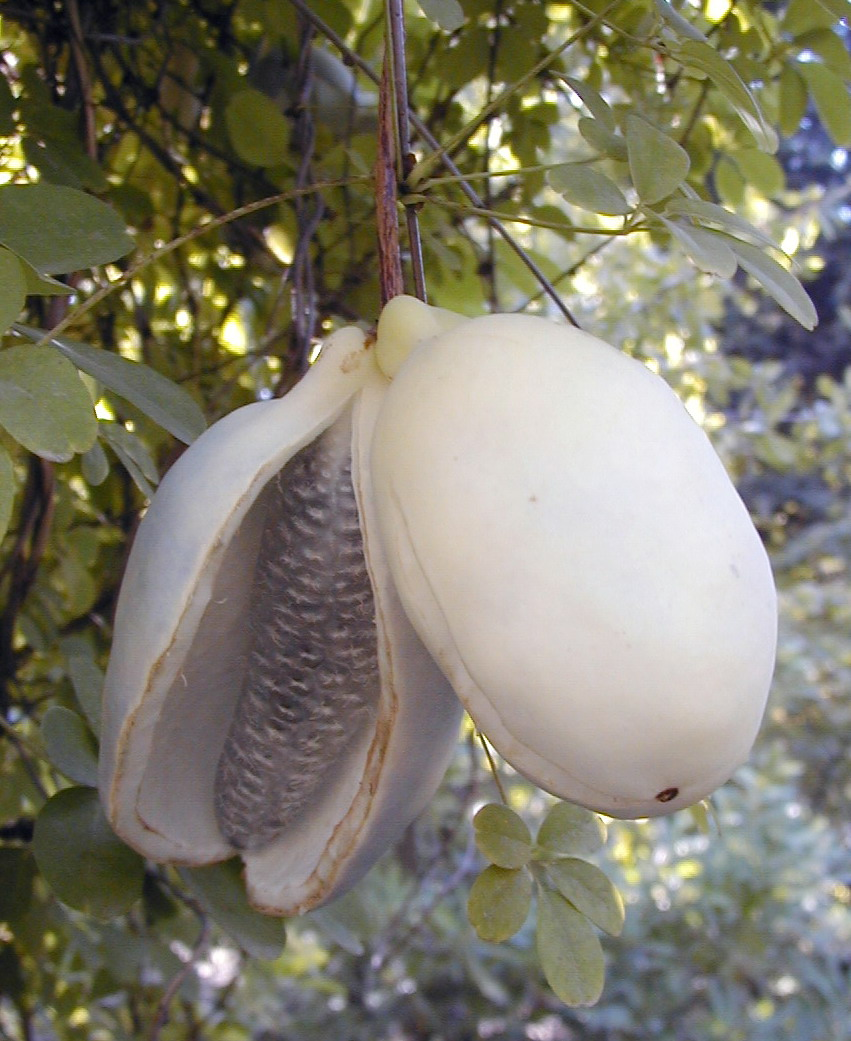
White variety of Akebia

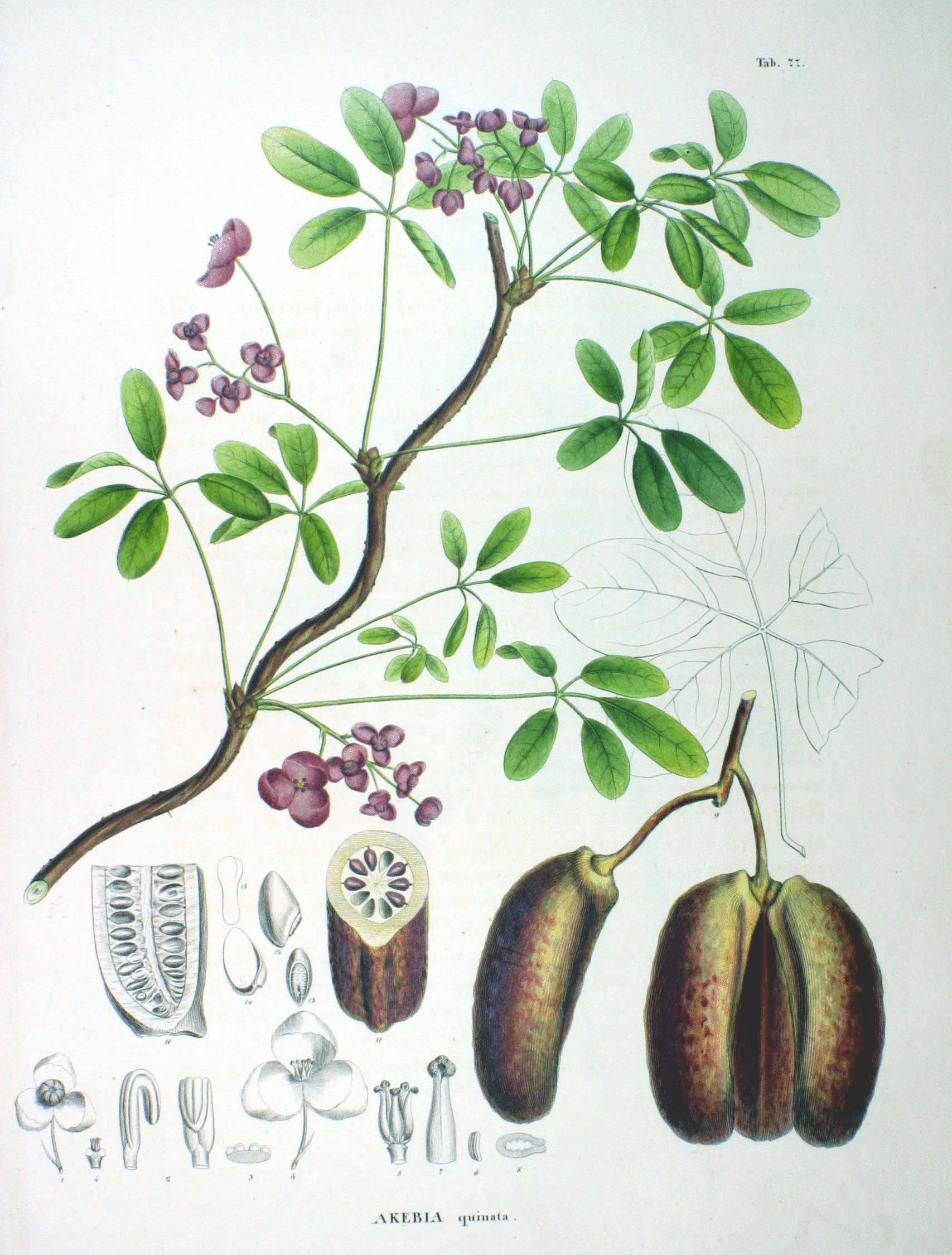
Botanical Illustration

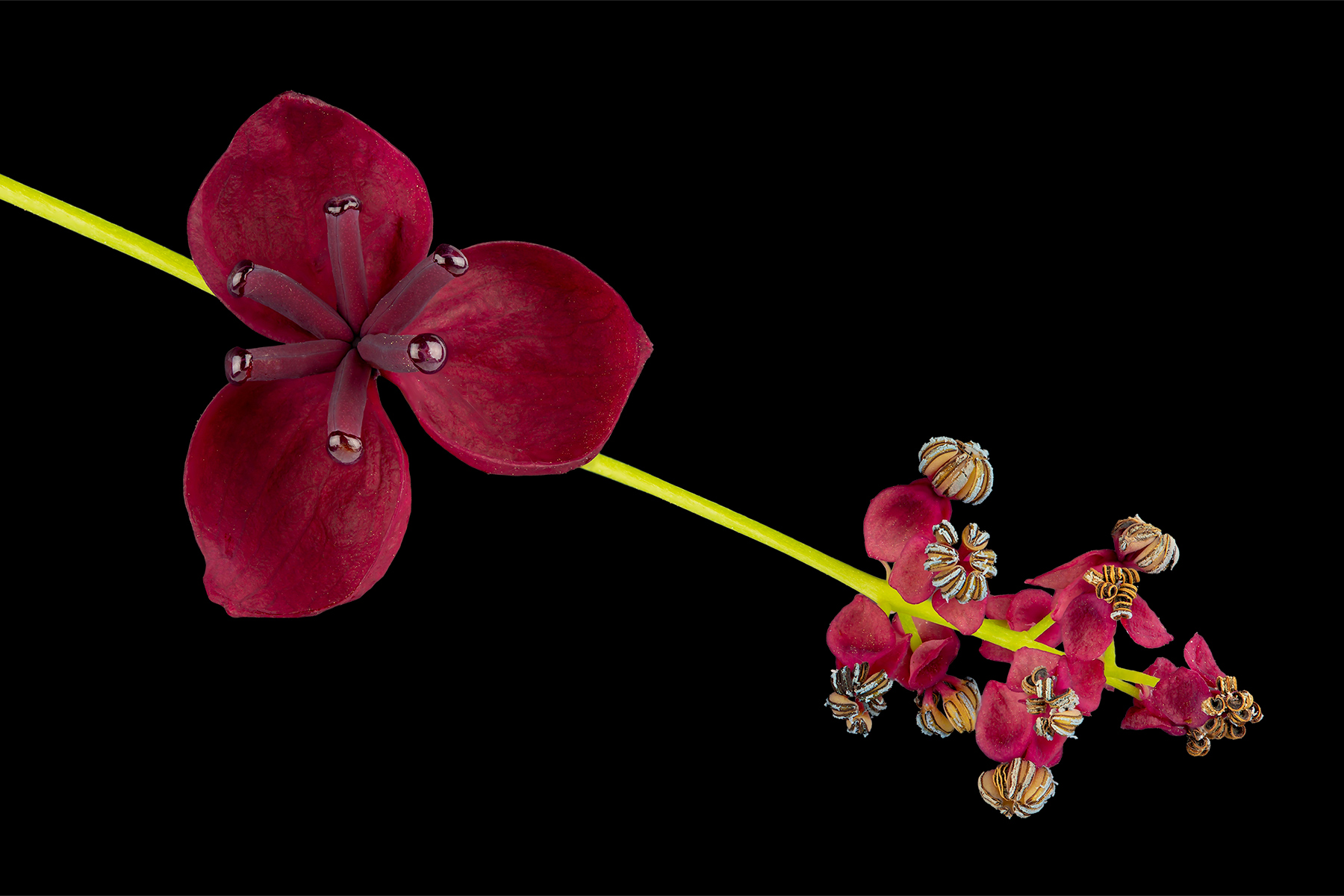
Female flower (left) and male flower (right)

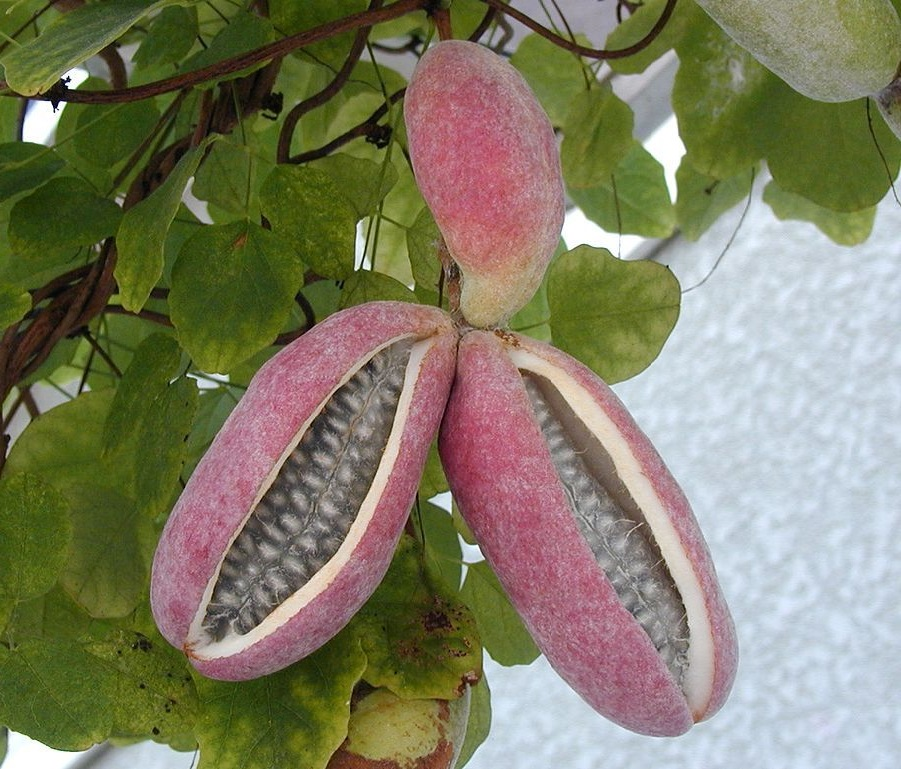
Pinker variety of A. quinata fruits

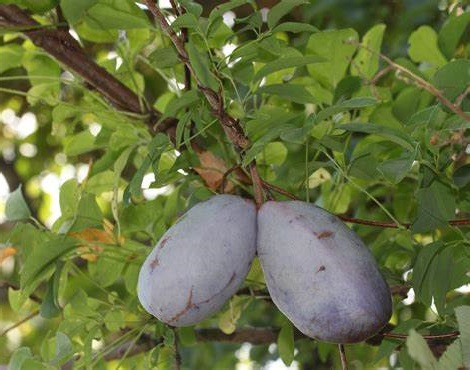
Bluish Fruits of Akebia

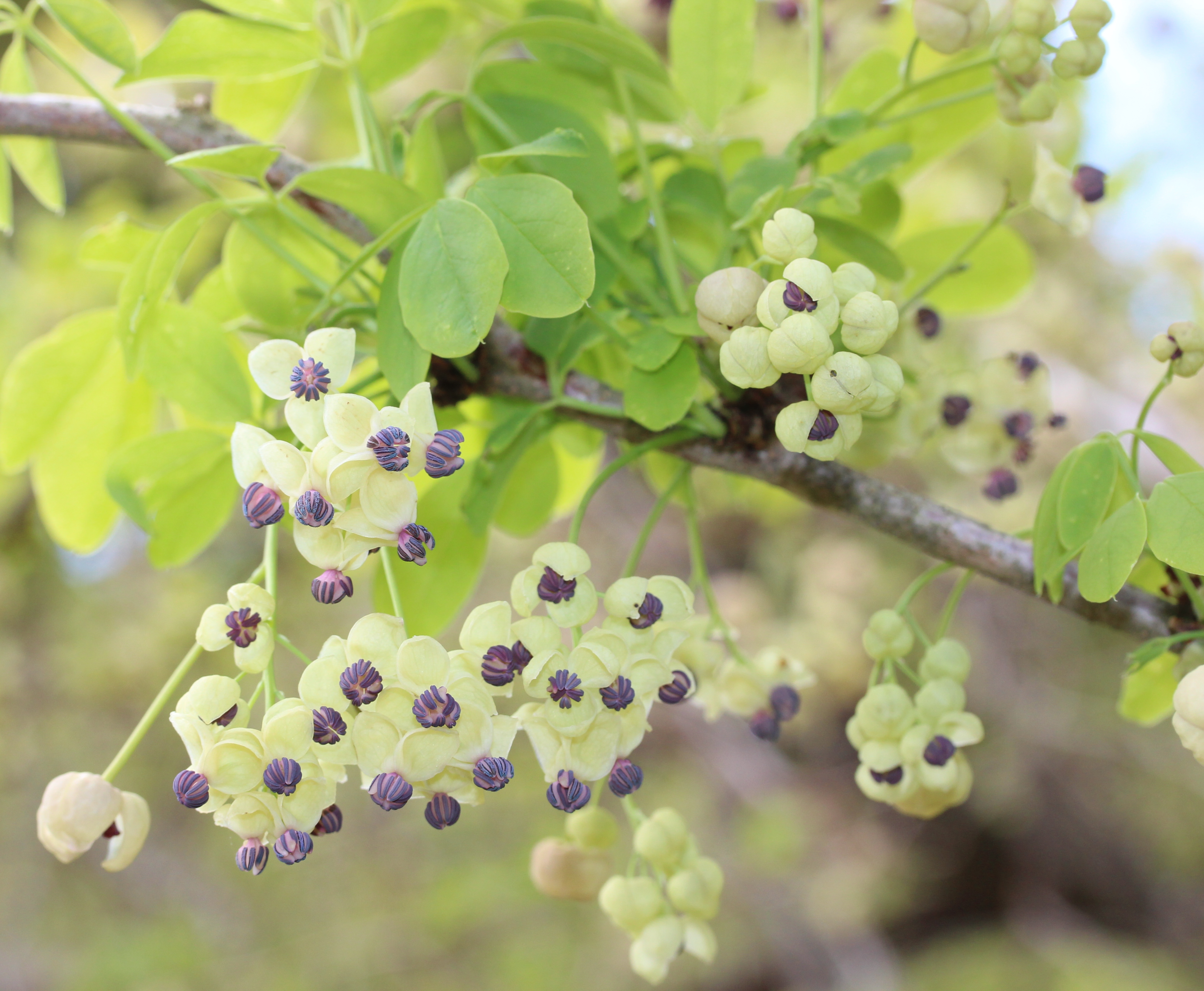
Silver Bells Akebia flowers

== See also ==
- Kampo herb list
