= Woodbine (plant) =

Woodbine may refer to:

Species of Lonicera (honeysuckle), particularly:

- Lonicera periclymenum, European honeysuckle
- Lonicera xylosteum, fly honeysuckle

Species of Parthenocissus, which are ironically not bines, having tendrils. Particularly:

- Parthenocissus quinquefolia, Virginia creeper
- Parthenocissus tricuspidata, Japanese creeper
- Parthenocissus inserta, thicket creeper, false Virginia creeper

Unrelated species:

- Clematis virginiana, devil's darning needles
- Gelsemium sempervirens, yellow jessamine
