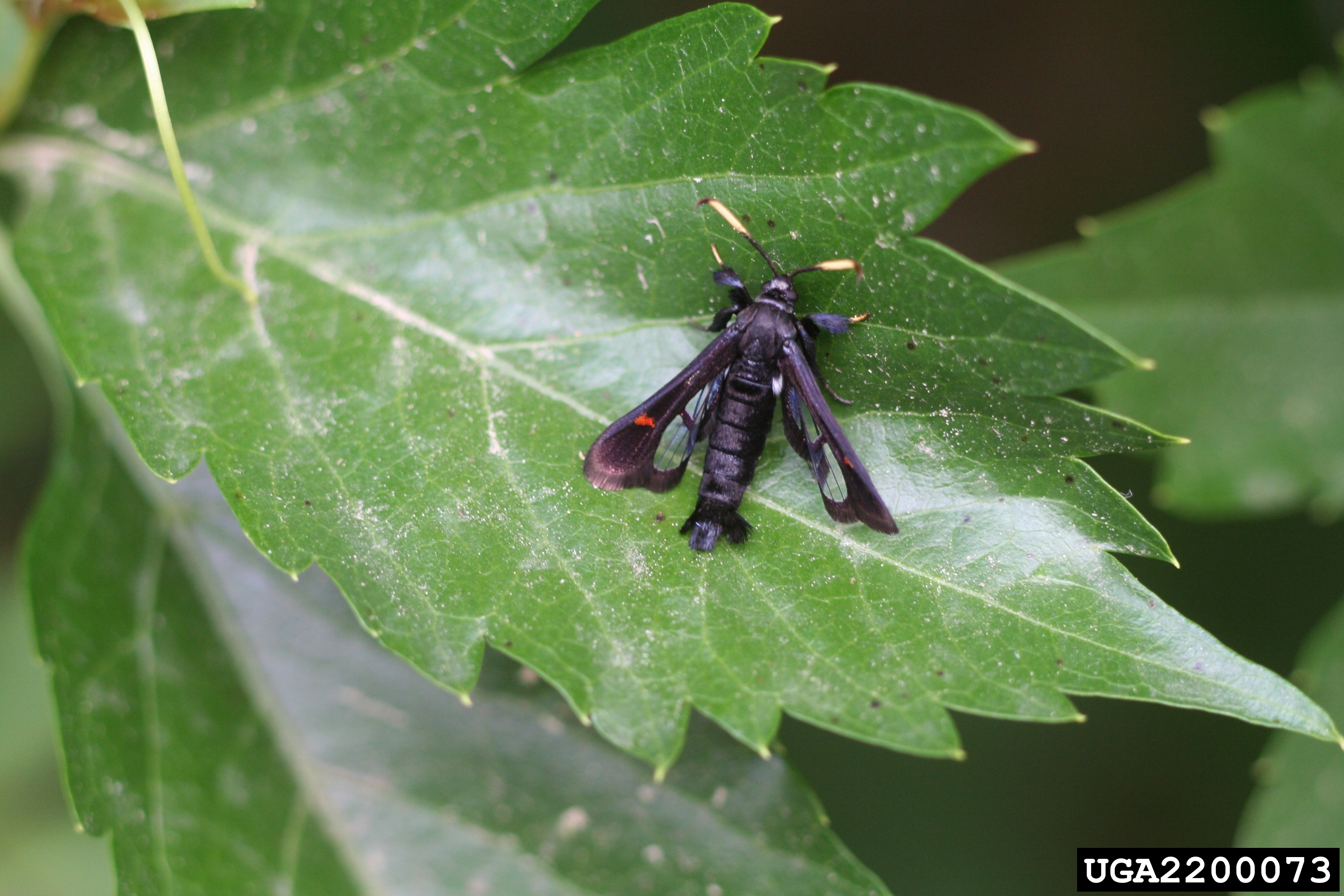

Scientific classification
- Domain: Eukaryota
- Kingdom: Animalia
- Phylum: Arthropoda
- Class: Insecta
- Order: Lepidoptera
- Family: Sesiidae
- Genus: Albuna
- Species: A. fraxini

Binomial name
- Albuna fraxini (Edwards, 1881)

Synonyms
- Carmenta fraxini Edwards, 1881; Harmonia morrisoni (Edwards, 1882); Albuna fraxini f. vitriosa Engelhardt, 1946

= Albuna fraxini =

Virginia creeper clearwing

Species of moth

Albuna fraxini, the Virginia creeper clearwing, is a moth of the family Sesiidae. It is known from the northern United States and southern Canada.

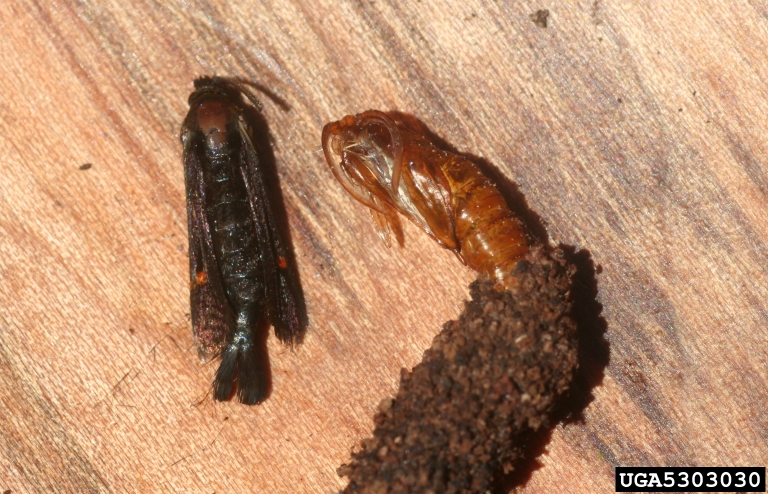
Life Cycle

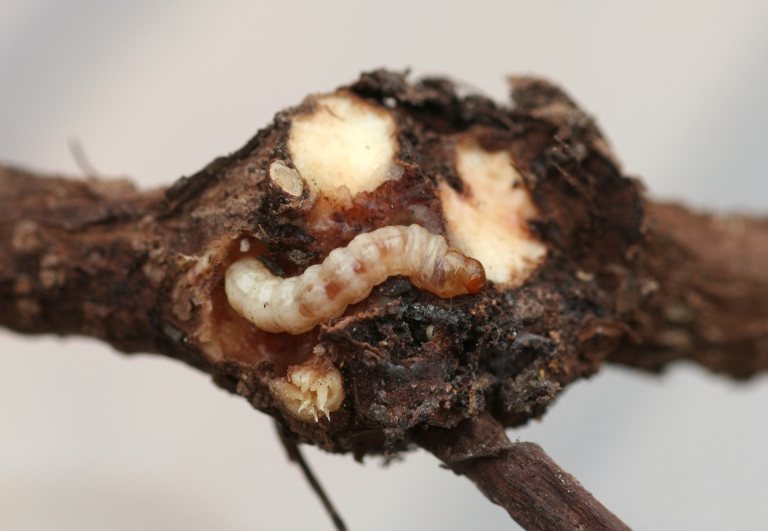
Larva

The wingspan is about 18 mm. Adults are on wing from June to August. Adults generally only live for a week. Females emit pheromones to attract mates soon after emerging from pupae.

The larvae feed on Virginia creeper, white, red, green, and European ash, and sometimes mountain-ash.
