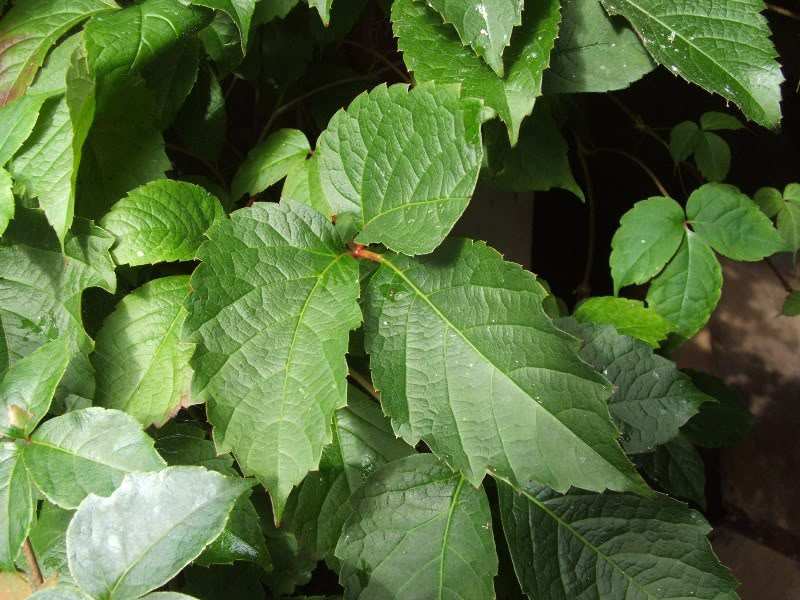

Scientific classification
- Kingdom: Plantae
- Clade: Tracheophytes
- Clade: Angiosperms
- Clade: Eudicots
- Clade: Rosids
- Order: Vitales
- Family: Vitaceae
- Genus: Parthenocissus
- Species: P. semicordata

Binomial name
- Parthenocissus semicordata (Wall) Planch. 1811

= Parthenocissus semicordata =

Species of vine

Parthenocissus semicordata (Wall) Planch. 1811 (synonym: P. himalayana) is a creeper related to the grapevine family. It is a native plant of the Himalaya. Its name is derived from Latin 'corda' meaning heart.
