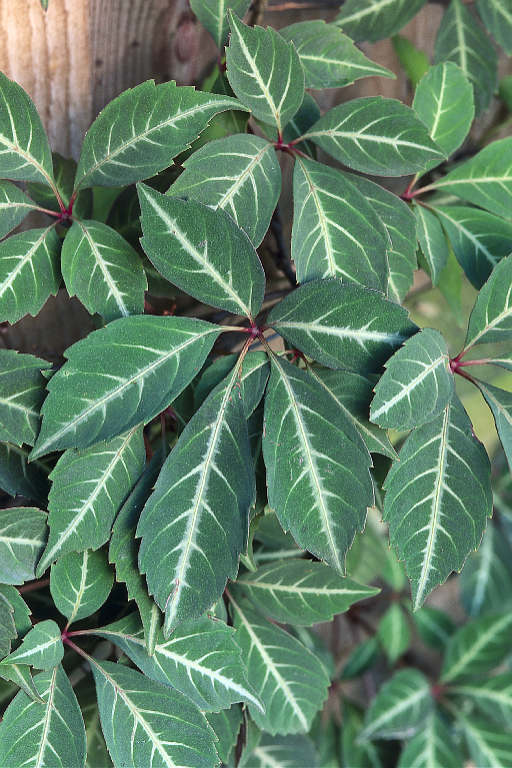

Scientific classification
- Kingdom: Plantae
- Clade: Tracheophytes
- Clade: Angiosperms
- Clade: Eudicots
- Clade: Rosids
- Order: Vitales
- Family: Vitaceae
- Genus: Parthenocissus
- Species: P. henryana

Binomial name
- Parthenocissus henryana (Hemsl.) Diels & Gilg

= Parthenocissus henryana =

Species of vine

Parthenocissus henryana (Chinese Virginia-creeper or silver vein creeper) is a species of flowering plant in the vine family Vitaceae, native to China.

== Description ==
It is a vigorous, deciduous tendril climber growing to 10 m (33 ft). It has a more restrained growth than the other Virginia creepers. The large palmate leaves consist of five to nine oval leaflets, each up to 12 cm (5 in) long, with strong white veining. The leaves colour to a brilliant red in autumn before falling. Clusters of inconspicuous flowers in summer may be followed by black fruits.

== Cultivation ==
In China it grows on moist rocks, at heights of 100–1,500 m (300–4,900 ft).

Parthenocissus henryana can grow on walls and trellising, in large pots, and as a groundcover on slopes. It is propagated from seeds or cuttings. It has gained the Royal Horticultural Society's Award of Garden Merit.
