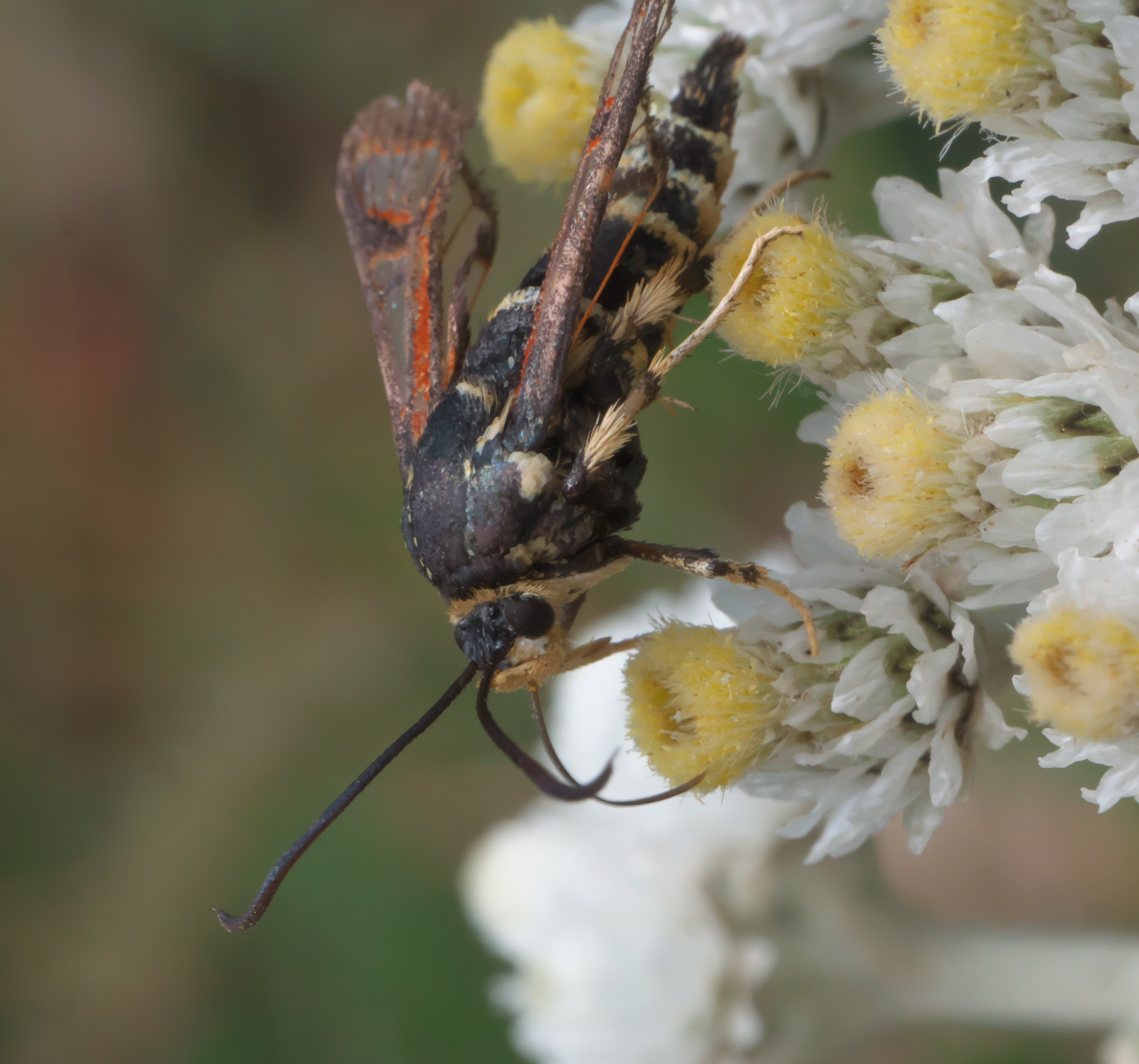

Scientific classification
- Kingdom: Animalia
- Phylum: Arthropoda
- Class: Insecta
- Order: Lepidoptera
- Family: Sesiidae
- Genus: Albuna
- Species: A. pyramidalis

Binomial name
- Albuna pyramidalis (Walker, 1856)

= Albuna pyramidalis =

Species of moth

Albuna pyramidalis, the fireweed clearwing moth, is a species of clearwing moth in the family Sesiidae.

The MONA or Hodges number for Albuna pyramidalis is 2533.

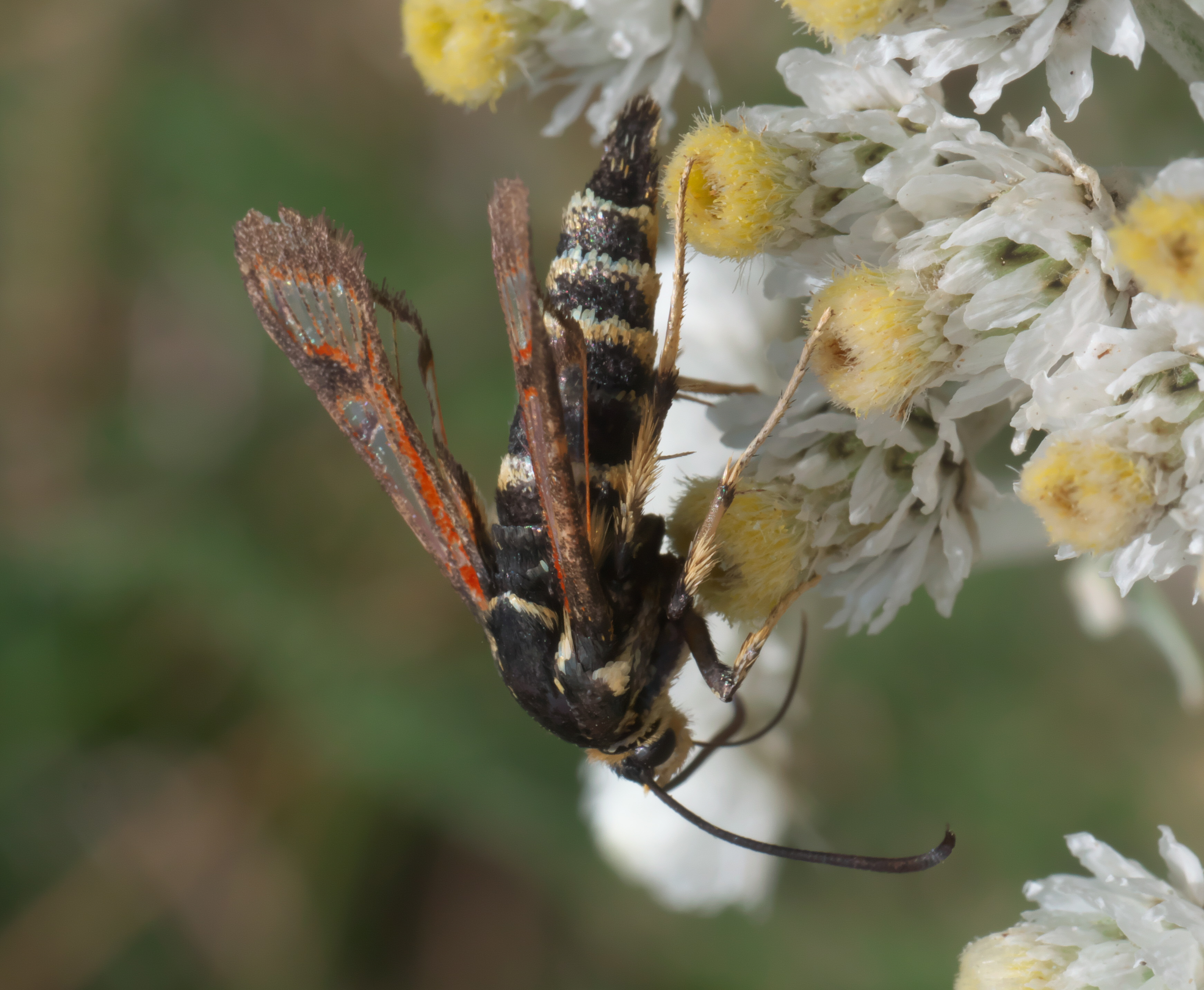
Fireweed clearwing moth, Albuna pyramidalis

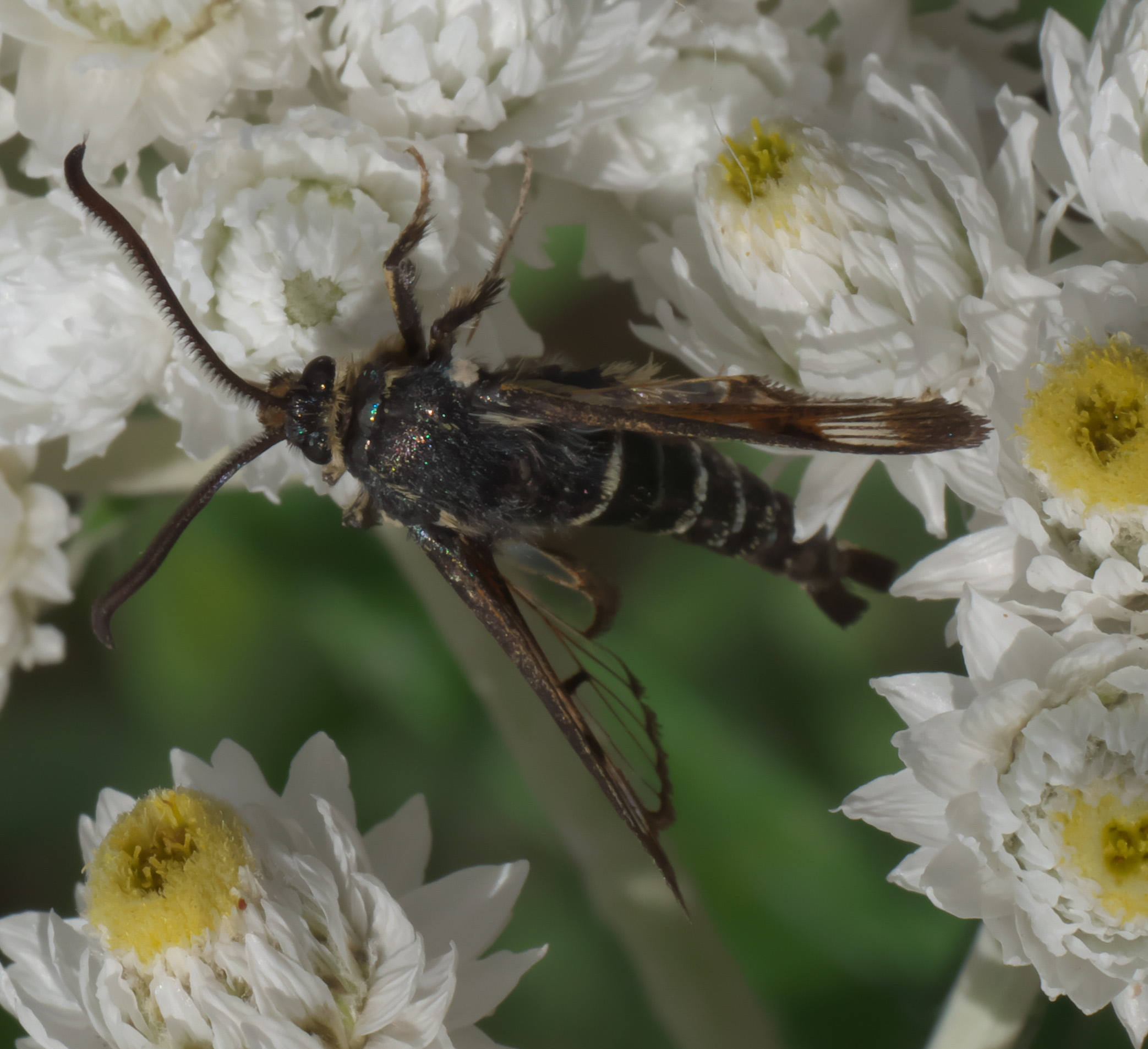
Fireweed clearwing moth, Albuna pyramidalis
