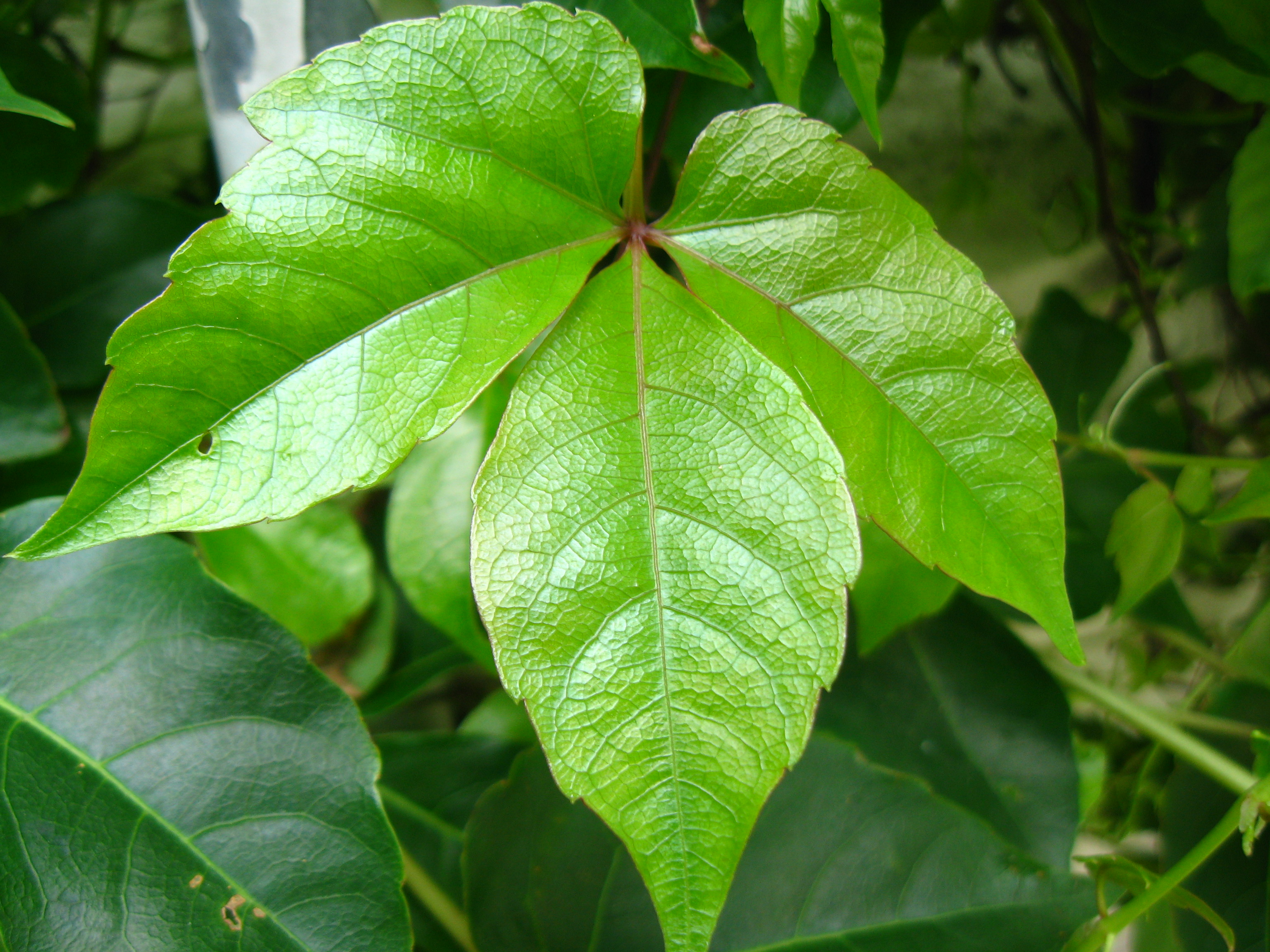

Scientific classification
- Kingdom: Plantae
- Clade: Tracheophytes
- Clade: Angiosperms
- Clade: Eudicots
- Clade: Rosids
- Order: Vitales
- Family: Vitaceae
- Genus: Parthenocissus
- Species: P. dalzielii

Binomial name
- Parthenocissus dalzielii Gagnep.

= Parthenocissus dalzielii =

Species of vine

Parthenocissus dalzielii (Gagnepain 1911) is a creeper related to the grapevine family. It is a native plant of East and South-east Asia.

In China it is found in Anhui, Fujian, Guangdon, Guangxi, Henan, Hubei, Hunan, Jiangsu, Jiangxi, Sichuan and Zhejiang. It is commonly used in Hong Kong by the government as part of slope stabilization. Its Chinese name is 爬山虎.

== Growth ==
Parthenocissus dalzielli can grow in pots or on slopes. It is propagated from seeds or cuttings. It needs much light and humid weather.

== Characteristics ==
Parthenocissus dalzielii is a deciduous vine with broad, trifoliate leaves. It sticks well to walls and sloping surfaces, even painted concrete using suction cups which excrete calcium carbonate. It has small fruit which look like grapes and are dark blue almost black when ripe.

== Cultivation and uses ==
Parthenocissus dalzielii is recognised as a form of climate control as it provides shelter in summer yet loses its leaves in winter allowing for passive summer cooling and winter heating, reducing energy consumptions.
