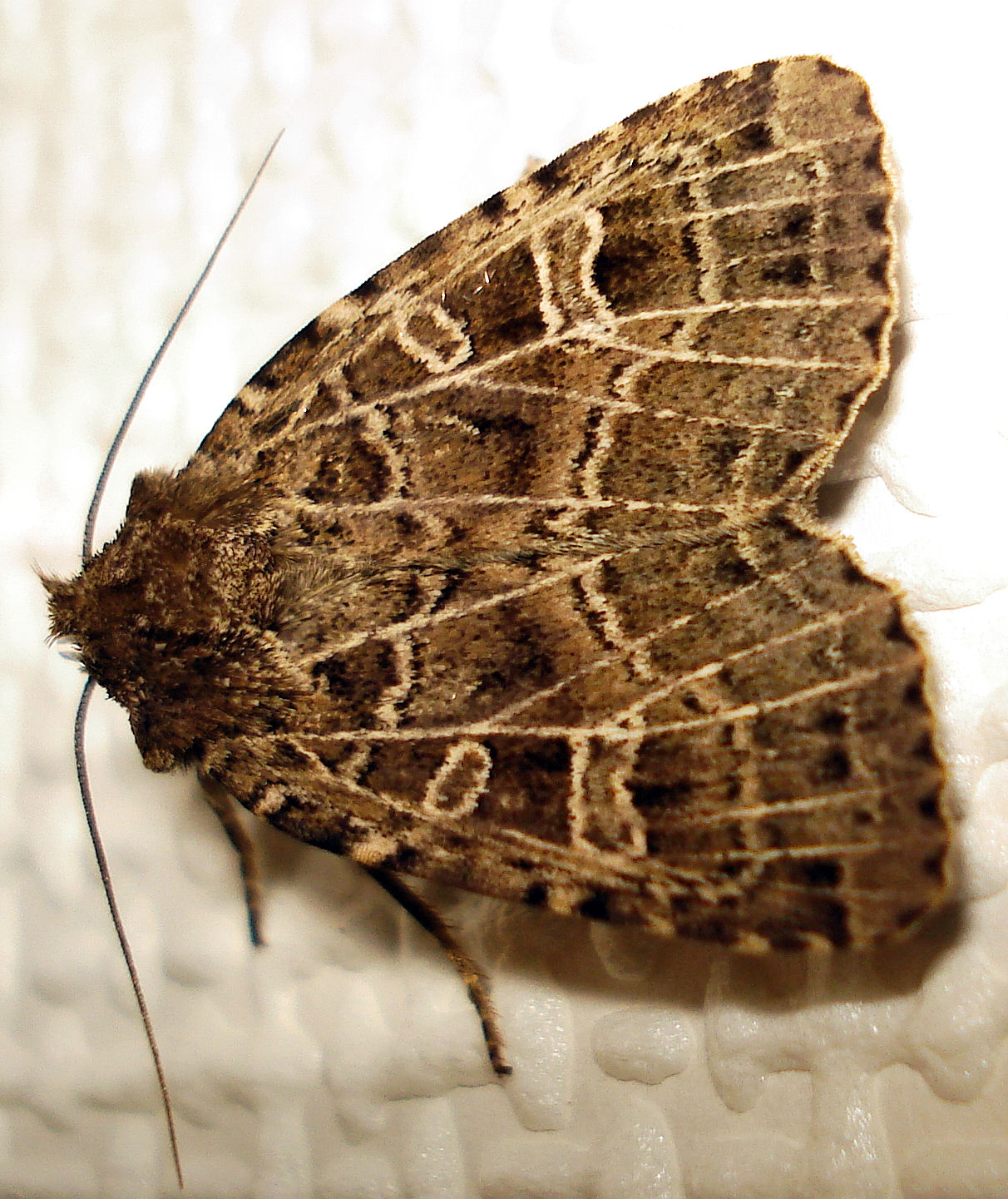
- Naenia typica

Scientific classification
- Domain: Eukaryota
- Kingdom: Animalia
- Phylum: Arthropoda
- Class: Insecta
- Order: Lepidoptera
- Superfamily: Noctuoidea
- Family: Noctuidae
- Subfamily: Noctuinae
- Genus: Naenia; Stephens, 1827

= Naenia (moth) =

Genus of moths

Naenia is a genus of moths of the family Noctuidae erected by Stephens in 1827.

== Species ==
- Naenia contaminata (Walker, 1865)
- Naenia typica (Linnaeus, 1758) – the Gothic
