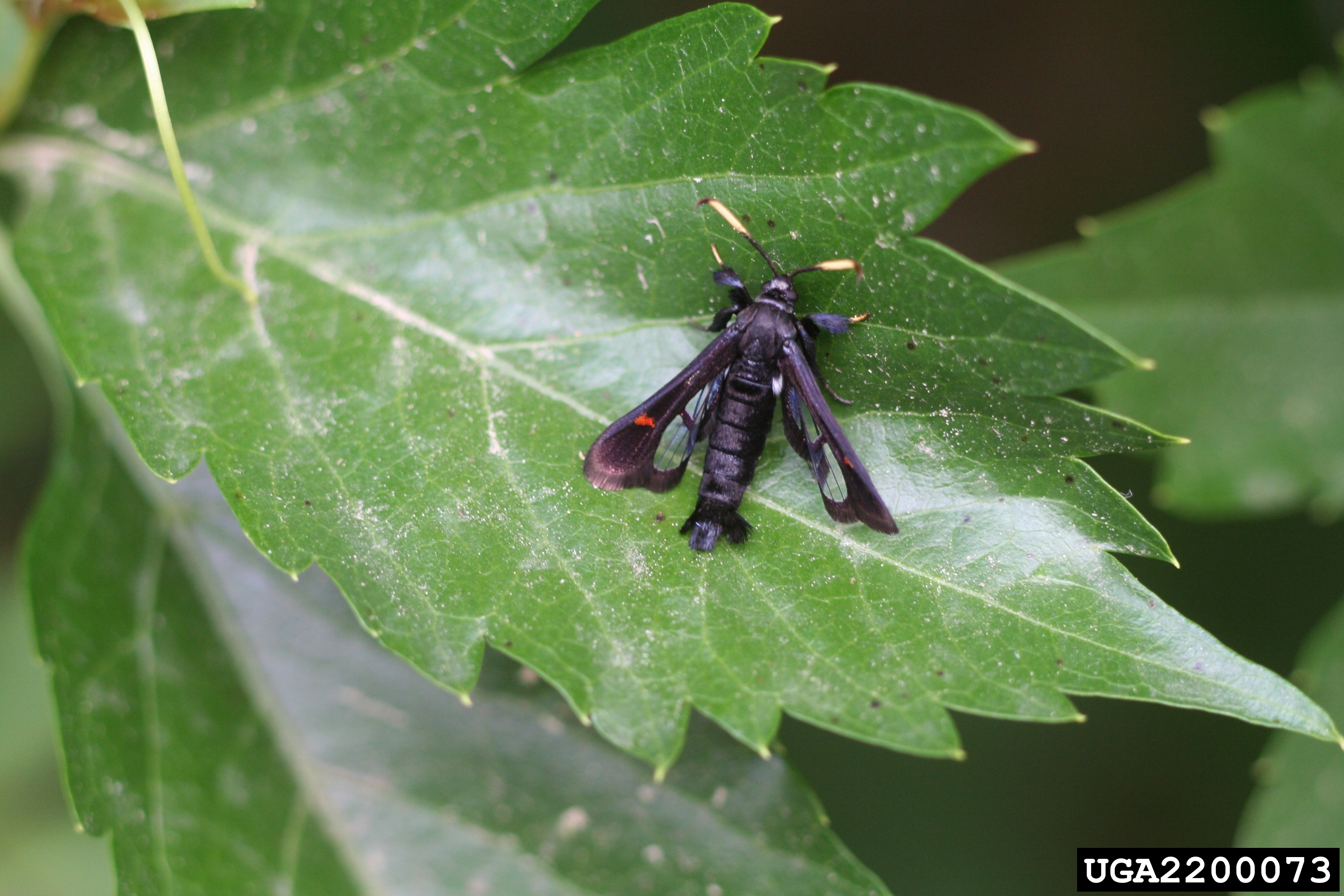
- Albuna fraxini

Scientific classification
- Domain: Eukaryota
- Kingdom: Animalia
- Phylum: Arthropoda
- Class: Insecta
- Order: Lepidoptera
- Family: Sesiidae
- Tribe: Paranthrenini
- Genus: Albuna; Edwards, 1881

Species
- See text

= Albuna =

Genus of moths

Albuna is a genus of moths in the family Sesiidae.

== Species ==
- Albuna fraxini (Edwards, 1881) – Virginia creeper clearwing
- Albuna pyramidalis (Walker, 1856)
- Albuna bicaudata Eichlin, 1989
- Albuna polybiaformis Eichlin, 1989
- Albuna rufibasilaris Eichlin, 1989
