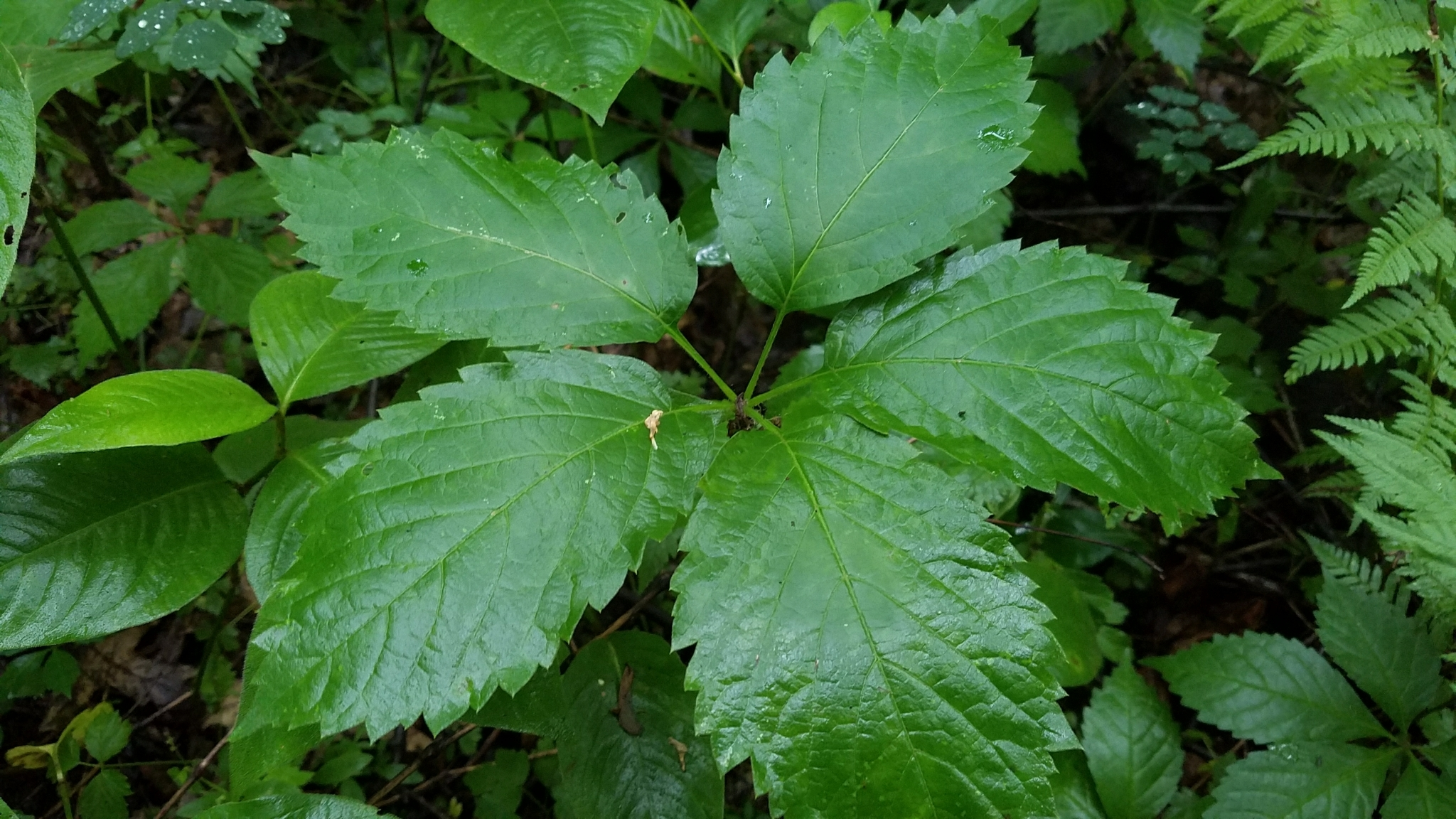

Scientific classification
- Kingdom: Plantae
- Clade: Tracheophytes
- Clade: Angiosperms
- Clade: Eudicots
- Clade: Rosids
- Order: Vitales
- Family: Vitaceae
- Genus: Parthenocissus
- Species: P. inserta

Binomial name
- Parthenocissus inserta (A.Kern.) Fritsch

Synonyms
- Ampelopsis quinquefolia var. vitacea Knerr; Parthenocissus vitacea (Knerr) Hitchc.; Psedera vitacea (Knerr) Greene; Vitis inserta A.Kern.; Vitis vitacea (Knerr) Bean

= Parthenocissus inserta =

Species of vine

Parthenocissus inserta (syn. Parthenocissus vitacea), also known as thicket creeper, false Virginia creeper, woodbine, or grape woodbine, is a woody vine native to North America. Contact with it may cause dermatitis.

== Description ==
Parthenocissus inserta is a climbing and sprawling woody vine (liana), reaching lengths of 20 metres (66 ft), using small branched tendrils with twining tips. The leaves are palmately compound, composed of five leaflets, each leaflet reaching 13 centimetres (5 in) in length and 7 cm broad. The leaflets have a coarsely toothed margin.

The flowers are small and greenish, produced in clusters in late spring, and mature in late summer or early fall into small blue-black berries. The berries are up to 1.5 cm (1/2 in) wide and technically palatable. Like the very similar Parthenocissus quinquefolia (Virginia creeper)., the fruit and leaves contain needle-shaped crystals of calcium oxalate monohydrate called raphide, which may cause blistering or rashes if touched or consumed.

=== Similar species ===
Parthenocissus inserta is closely related to and commonly confused with Parthenocissus quinquefolia (Virginia creeper). They differ in their means of climbing, with the tendrils twining around plant stems in P. inserta lacking the round, adhesive discs found on the tendril tips of P. quinquefolia, though the ends may be club-shaped when inserted into a crevice. One consequence of this is that (unlike P. quinquefolia) it cannot climb smooth walls, only through shrubs and trees. In addition, the leaflets of P. inserta are shiny when young and only slightly pale below, while those of P. quinquefolia are dull above and pale green, whitened, or glaucous below. P. inserta flowerhead branching is dichotomous or trichotomous, with branches of equal thickness, while P. quinquefolia branches unequally, with a definite central axis. The berries of P. inserta are larger, 8–12 millimetres (3/8–1/2 in) in diameter, versus 5–8 mm broad in P. quinquefolia. The petiolules of mature P. inserta leaflets are typically 5–30 mm (1/4–1 1/8 in) long, versus sessile or up to 10 mm in P. quinquefolia.

== Taxonomy ==
Parthenocissus inserta was first described in 1887 by Anton Kerner, as Vitis inserta. It was transferred to Parthenocissus by Karl Fritsch in 1922. Separately, in 1893, Ellsworth Brownell Knerr described it as the variety vitacea of Ampelopsis quinquefolia (a synonym of Parthenocissus quinquefolia). Albert Spear Hitchcock raised the variety to the full species Parthenocissus vitacea in 1894. Kerner's epithet inserta has priority over Knerr's vitacea, so the correct name is Parthenocissus inserta.

== Distribution and habitat ==
It can be found in southeastern Canada (west to southern Manitoba) and a large area of the United States, from Maine west to Montana and south to New Jersey and Missouri in the east, and Texas to Arizona in the west. It is becoming invasive in northeast Louisiana. It is present in California, but it may be an introduced species that far west. It is introduced in Europe.

== Ecology ==
The flowers of thicket creeper are frequently visited by Mordella marginata, a tumbling flower beetle. Several bee species have been observed collecting pollen from the flowers, including the sweat bees Augochlora pura, Lasioglossum subviridatum, and Lasioglossum zephyrus. The fruits are eaten by birds.

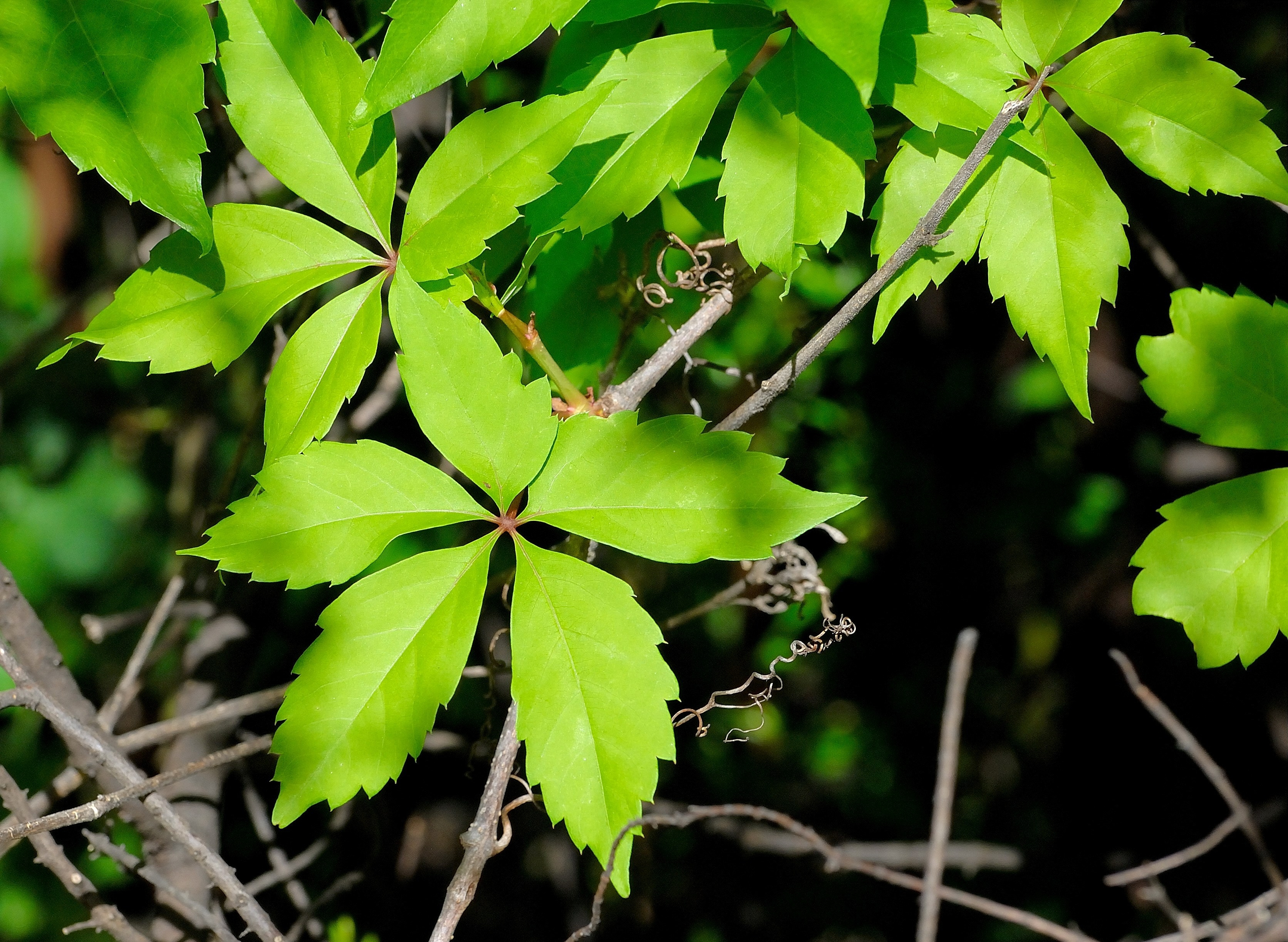
Leaves and tendrils

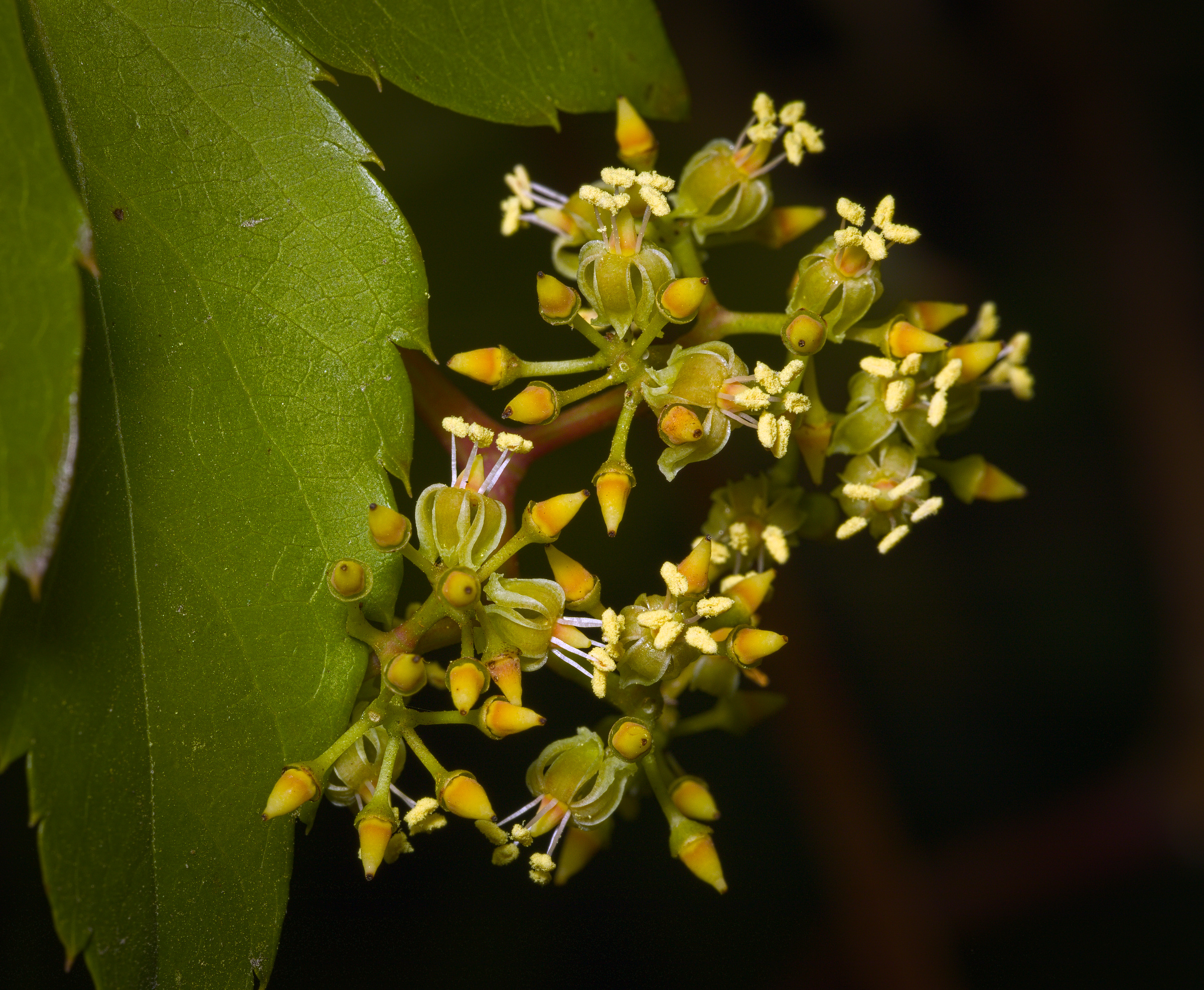
Flowers

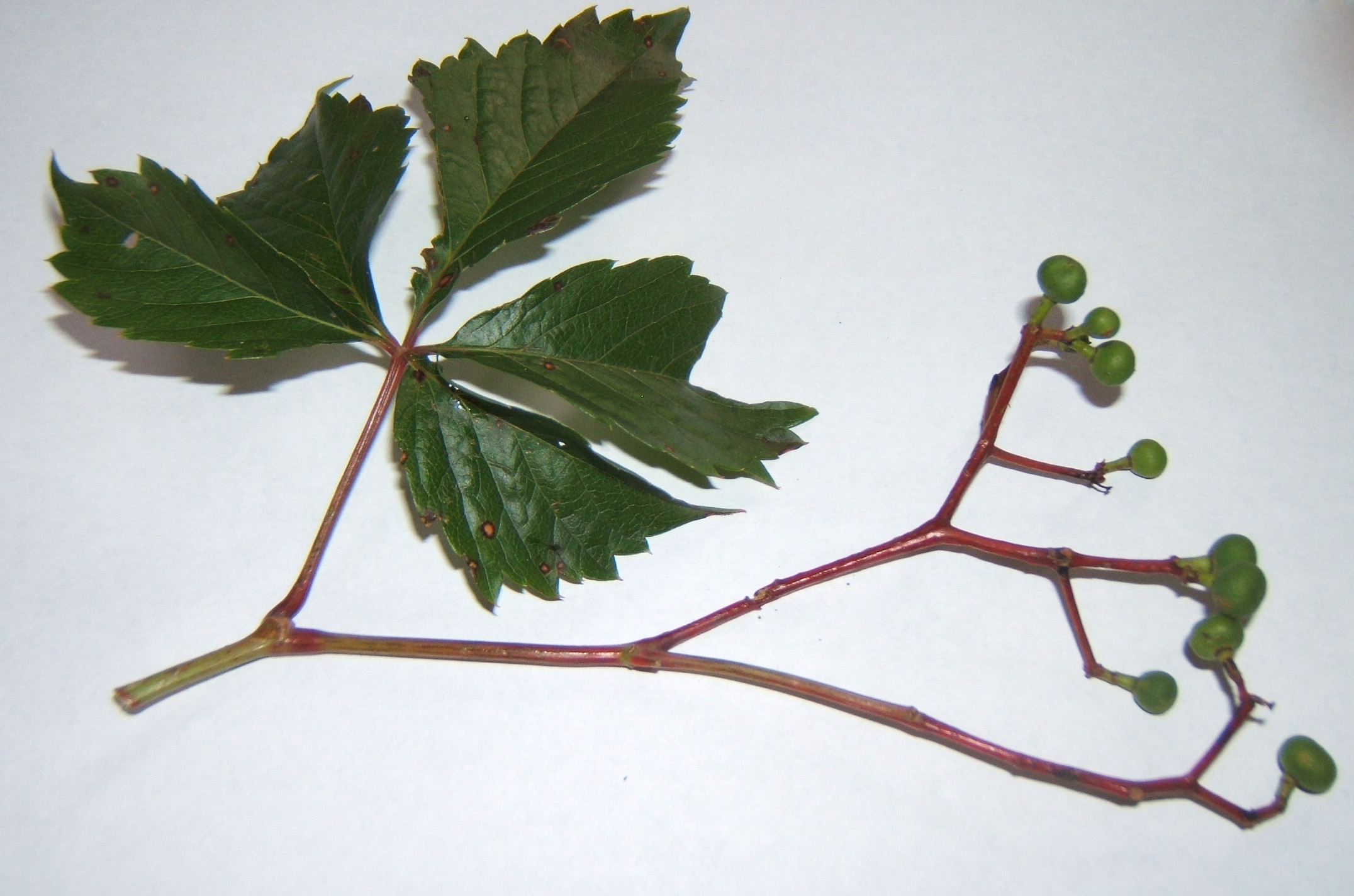
Detail of berries

== Health concerns ==
The plant may cause dermatitis in areas of the body that directly contacted the sap of the leaves or fruit
