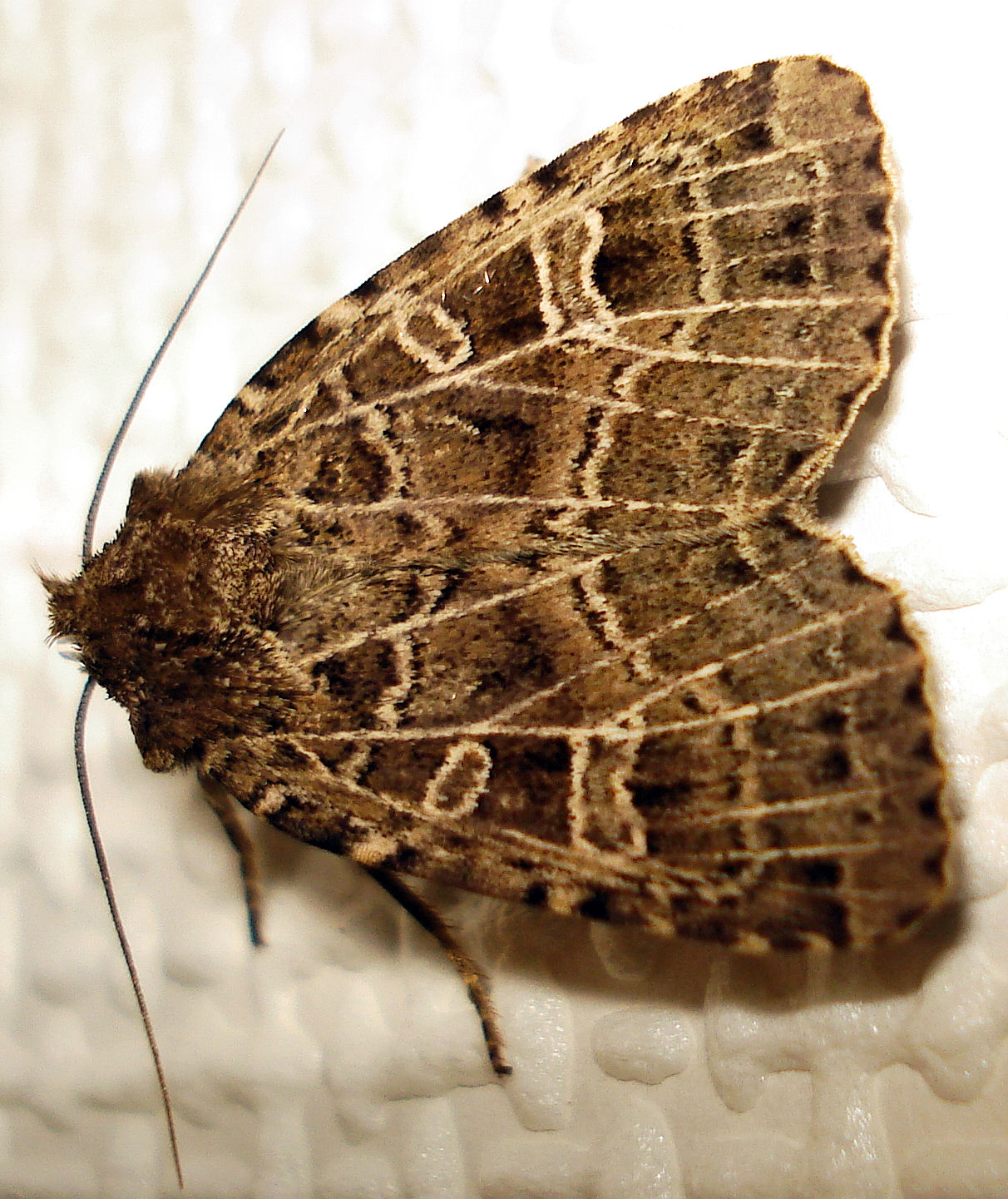

Scientific classification
- Kingdom: Animalia
- Phylum: Arthropoda
- Class: Insecta
- Order: Lepidoptera
- Superfamily: Noctuoidea
- Family: Noctuidae
- Genus: Naenia
- Species: N. typica

Binomial name
- Naenia typica (Linnaeus, 1758)

= Gothic (moth) =

Species of moth

The Gothic (Naenia typica) is a moth of the family Noctuidae. The species was first described by Carl Linnaeus in his 1758 10th edition of Systema Naturae. It is distributed in temperate Eurasia, in the Palearctic realm, including Europe, Turkey, Iran, Caucasus, Armenia, Transcaucasia, Central Asia, Altai Mountains, and west and central Siberia.

The forewings are broader than those of most other noctuids, and blackish with a network of fine white lines. The pattern is supposedly reminiscent of some elements of Gothic architecture. The hindwings are grey. The species flies at night in June and July in the British Isles. It sometimes comes to light but is not generally strongly attracted. By contrast, it is strongly attracted to sugar and flowers.

== Technical description and variation ==
This species has a wingspan of 36 to 46 mm. Forewing brownish fuscous, the veins pale; edges of the upper stigmata whitish; the cell blackish; lines pale with dark edges; hindwing brownish fuscous. The form issyca Püng, from Issykkul, is redder, and has the termen less crenulate. — brunnea Tutt has the ground colour ochreous brown with the veins pale ochreous instead of white.

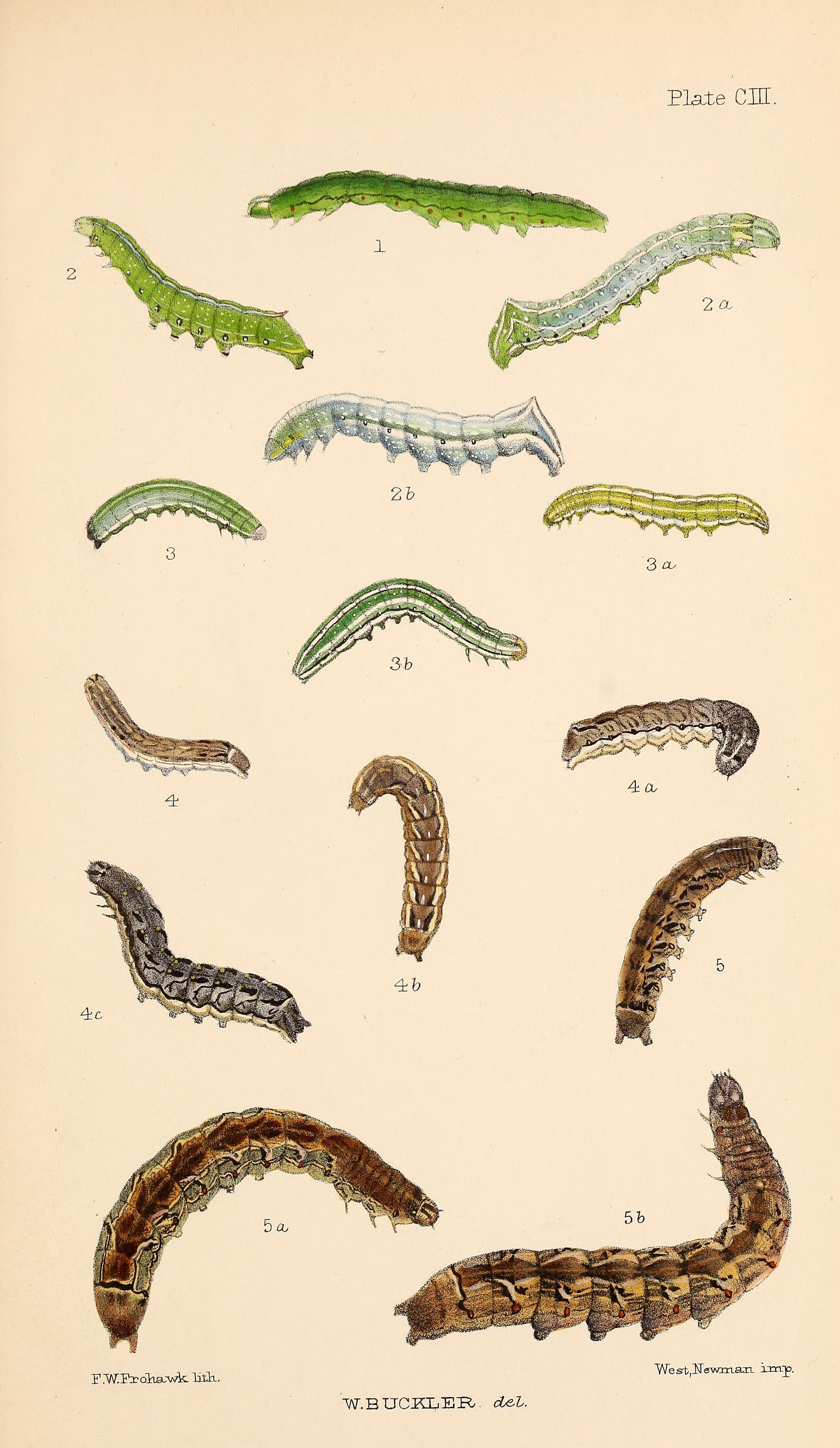
Fig 4 young larva 4a,4b,4c larvae after last moult

== Biology ==
Larvae are greenish grey, darker dorsally, with subdorsal black patches and a row of indistinct pale oblique streaks along the sides. The spiracular line is pale, pinkish ochreous, and broadly black edged above. The ventral surface is yellowish. It is gregarious when young. It is polyphagous, feeding on a wide range of plants, such as burdock, Artemisia, mustards, Buddleja, marigold, chrysanthemum, hawthorn, Cyclamen, silverberry, fireweed, forsythia, hop, lettuce, Lepisanthes, apple, Parthenocissus, plantain, Prunus, pear, rhododendron, willow, spinach, dandelion, coltsfoot, and nettle. This species overwinters as a larva.
