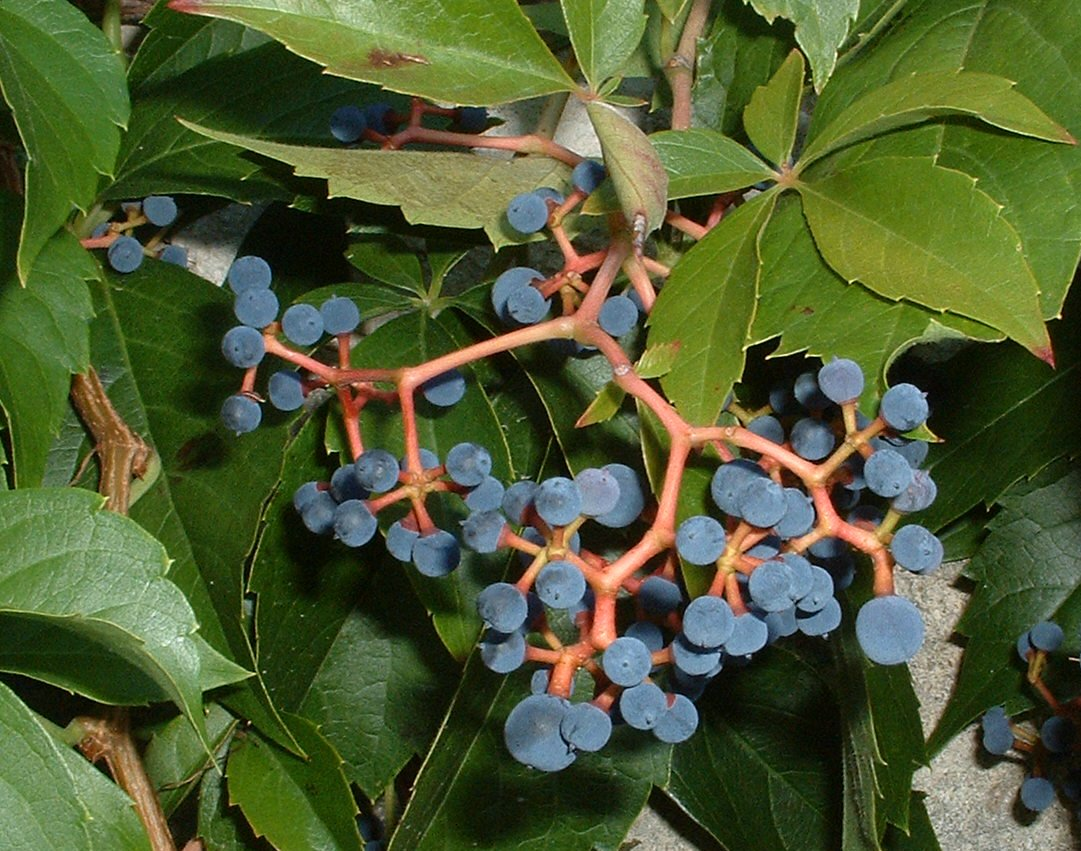
- Parthenocissus quinquefolia, foliage and fruit

Scientific classification
- Kingdom: Plantae
- Clade: Tracheophytes
- Clade: Angiosperms
- Clade: Eudicots
- Clade: Rosids
- Order: Vitales
- Family: Vitaceae
- Subfamily: Vitoideae
- Genus: Parthenocissus; Planch.

= Parthenocissus =

Genus of grapevines

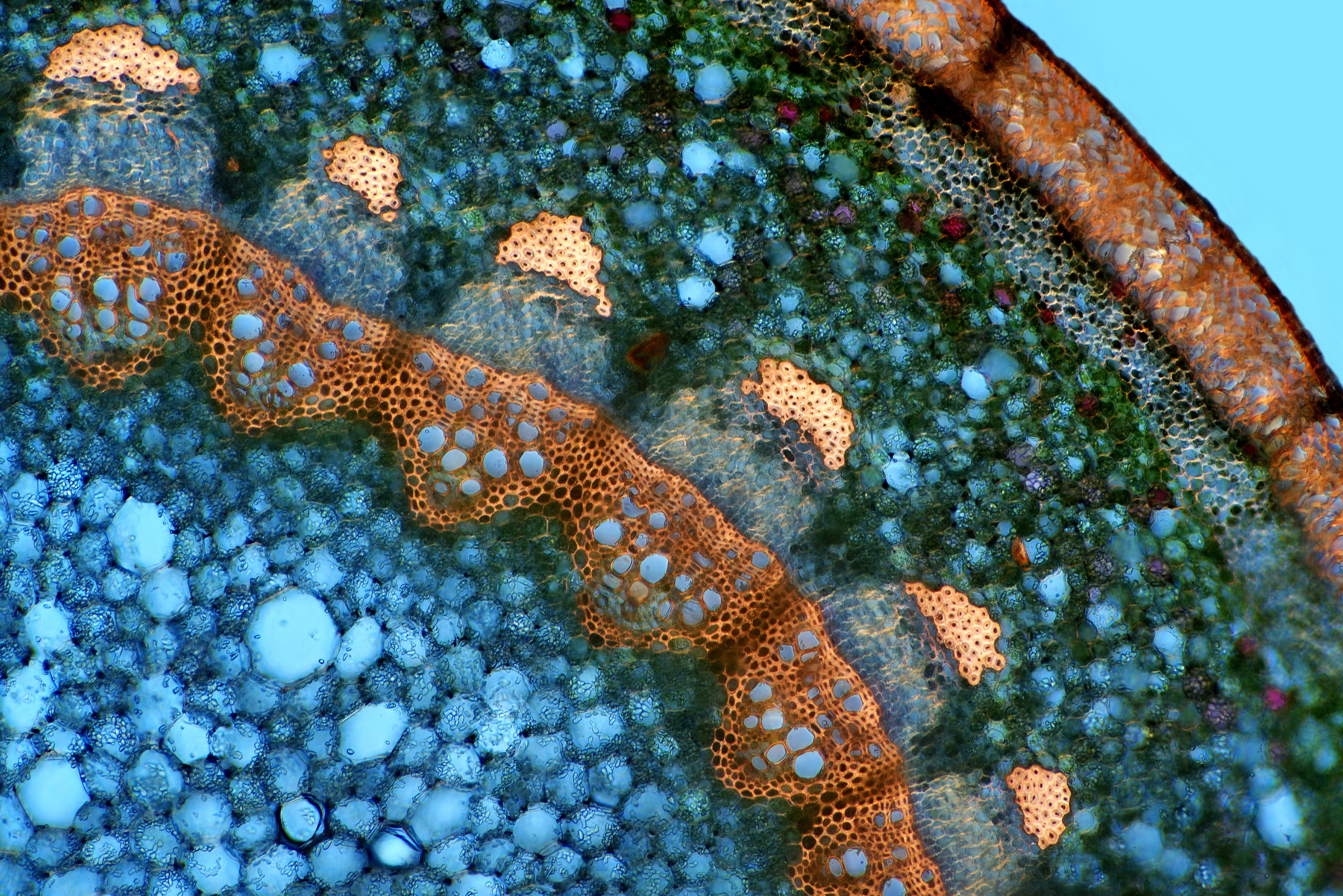
Creeper stalk transversal cross section.

Parthenocissus /ˌpɑːrθɪnoʊˈsɪsəs/, is a genus of tendril climbing plants in the grape family, Vitaceae. It contains about 12 species native to the Himalaya, eastern Asia and North America. Several are grown for ornamental use, notably P. henryana, P. quinquefolia and P. tricuspidata.

== Etymology ==
The name derives from the Greek παρθένος (parthenos) "virgin", and κισσός (kissós) (Latinized as "cissus"), "ivy". The reason is variously given as the ability of these creepers to form seeds without pollination or the English name of P. quinquefolia, Virginia creeper, which has become attached to the whole genus.

== Fossil record ==
Among the middle Miocene Sarmatian palynoflora from the Lavanttal Basin, Austrian researchers have recognized Parthenocissus fossil pollen. The sediment containing the Parthenocissus fossil pollen had accumulated in a lowland wetland environment with various vegetation units of mixed evergreen/deciduous broadleaved/conifer forests surrounding the wetland basin. Key relatives of the fossil taxa found with Parthenocissus are presently confined to humid warm temperate environments, suggesting a subtropical climate during the middle Miocene in Austria.

== Food plants ==
Parthenocissus species are used as food plants by the larvae of some Lepidoptera species including the brown-tail, Gothic, and the Virginia creeper sphinx.

== Species ==
=== From Asia ===
- Three leaved
  - Parthenocissus chinensis, this species grows in dry areas between 1300 and 2300 m in China in the west of both Sichuan and Yunnan.
  - Parthenocissus heterophylla, from China and Taiwan
  - Parthenocissus semicordata, from the Himalaya
  - Parthenocissus feddei, this species grows in rocky places between elevations of 600 and 1100 m in the Chinese provinces of Guangdong, Guizhou, Hubei and Hunan
- Five leaved
  - Parthenocissus henryana, Chinese Virginia creeper from China
  - Parthenocissus laetevirens
- One or three leaved
  - Parthenocissus dalzielii, from east and south-east Asia
  - Parthenocissus suberosa
  - Parthenocissus tricuspidata, Japanese creeper or Boston ivy, from eastern Asia

=== From North America ===
- Seven or five-leaved
  - Parthenocissus heptaphylla, sevenleaf creeper, from Texas and Mexico
  - Parthenocissus inserta, thicket creeper, woodbine, or grape woodbine, from western and northern North America
  - Parthenocissus quinquefolia, Virginia creeper, from eastern North America
