= Lasioglossum subviridatum =

Scientific classification
- Kingdom: Animalia
- Phylum: Arthropoda
- Class: Insecta
- Order: Hymenoptera
- Family: Halictidae
- Tribe: Halictini
- Genus: Lasioglossum
- Species: L. subviridatum

Binomial name
- Lasioglossum subviridatum (Cockerell, 1938)

Species of bee

Lasioglossum subviridatum is a species of sweat bee in the family Halictidae. It is one of the few sweat bees that nests in wood, and thus prefers woodland habitats.
