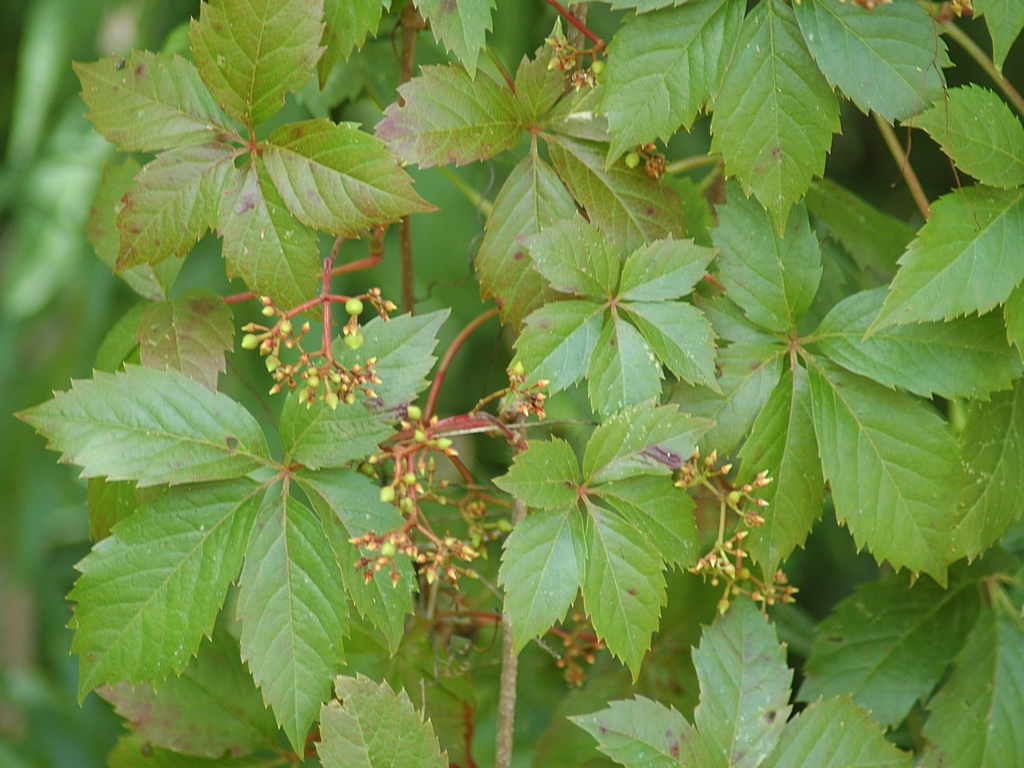

Conservation status
- Least Concern (IUCN 3.1)

- Secure (NatureServe)

Scientific classification
- Kingdom: Plantae
- Clade: Tracheophytes
- Clade: Angiosperms
- Clade: Eudicots
- Clade: Rosids
- Order: Vitales
- Family: Vitaceae
- Genus: Parthenocissus
- Species: P. quinquefolia

Binomial name
- Parthenocissus quinquefolia (L.) Planch.

Synonyms
- Ampelopsis hederacea Ehrh. Ampelopsis quinquefolia Michx.

= Parthenocissus quinquefolia =

Virginia creeper

Species of flowering plant

Parthenocissus quinquefolia, commonly known as Virginia creeper, woodbine, five-leaved ivy, or five-finger, is a species of flowering vine in the grape family Vitaceae.

The species is native to eastern and central North America, with its range extending from south-eastern Canada and the eastern United States, west to Manitoba and Utah, and as far south as eastern Mexico and Guatemala. It has been introduced globally and is considered an invasive species to varying degrees in the European Union, the United Kingdom, China, Australia, and Cuba.

== Names ==
The genus name, Parthenocissus, is a Latinisation of the Greek παρθένος (parthénos, "virgin, maiden") + κισσός (kissós, "ivy"). The specific epithet, quinquefolia, derives from the Latin quinque ("five") + folium ("leaf"), referring to the leaflets on each compound (palmate) leaf.

The name Virginia creeper, referring to both the plant's "virgin" epithet and to part of its native range in the U.S. state of Virginia, is also used for the whole genus Parthenocissus, as well as for other species within the genus.

This plant is also known as woodbine in North America, although the term can refer to other plant species. Other names, such as five-leaved ivy and five-finger, refer to the leaves' characteristic palmately compound structure.

Parthenocissus quinquefolia has long been familiar to indigenous peoples in the Americas. In the Mohawk language, the plant is called kontiráthens. In the Ojibwe language, it is called mnidoo-biimaakwad bebaamooded. The French, who would have encountered the plant by the seventeenth century, gave it the name vigne vierge ("virgin vine").

Parthenocissus quinquefolia is not closely related to the true ivy (genus Hedera), but instead to other members of the Vitaceae family, including the grapevine.

== Description ==
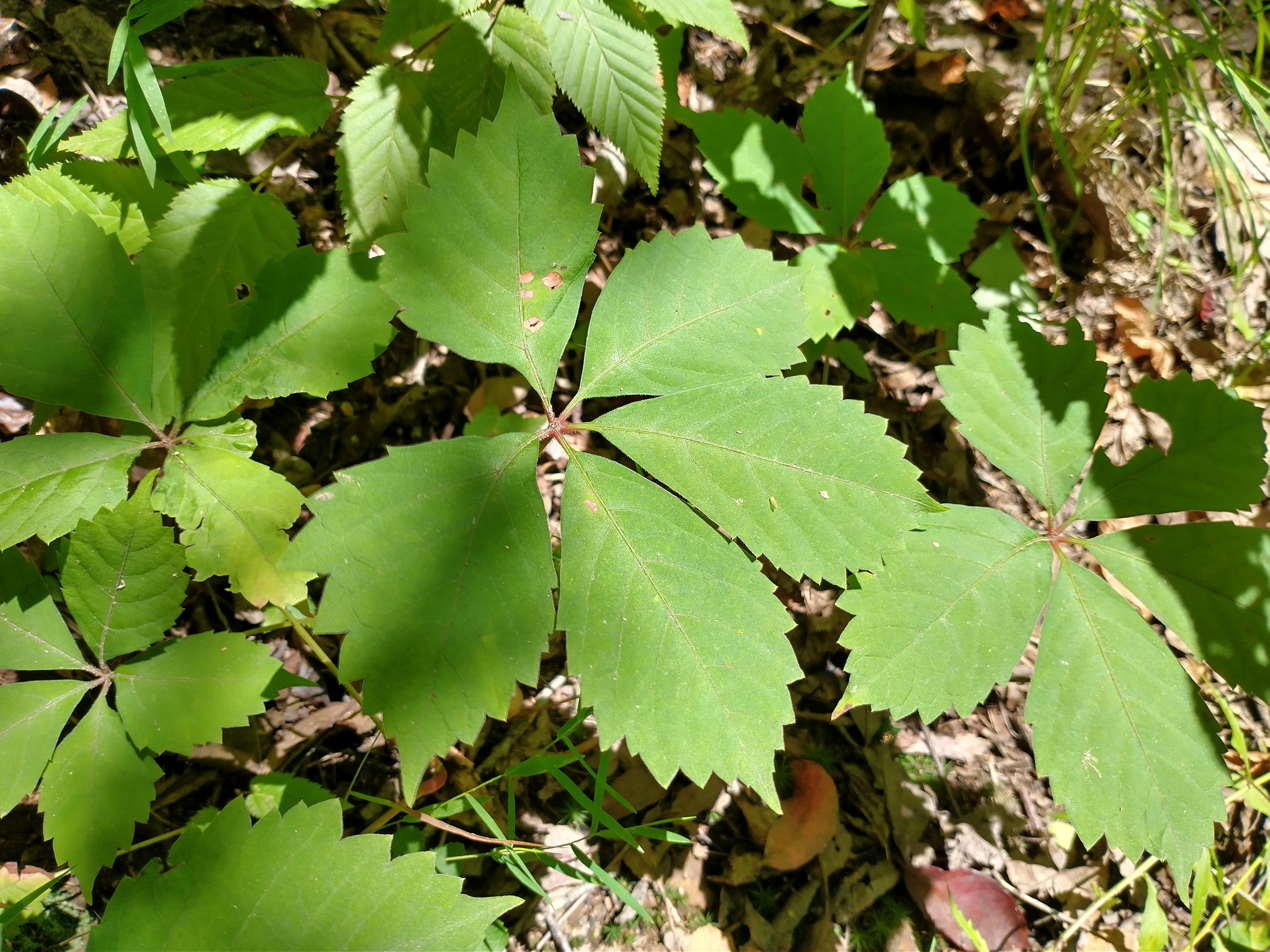
Leaves

Parthenocissus quinquefolia is a prolific deciduous climber, reaching heights of 20–30 m (70–100 ft) in the wild. It climbs smooth surfaces using small forked tendrils tipped with small strongly adhesive pads 5 mm (3/16 in) in size.

=== Leaves ===
The leaves are palmately compound, composed of five leaflets (rarely three leaflets, particularly on younger vines, and sometimes seven) joined from a central point on the leafstalk, and range from 3 to 20 cm (1 to 8 in) (rarely to 30 cm or 12 in) across. The leaflets have a toothed margin. Seedlings have heart-shaped cotyledon leaves. The species is often confused with P. vitacea or "False Virginia creeper", which has the same leaves, but does not have the adhesive pads at the end of its tendrils.

It is sometimes mistaken for Toxicodendron radicans (poison ivy), despite having five leaflets (poison ivy has three). While the leaves of P. quinquefolia do not produce urushiol, the sap within the leaves and stem contains raphides (needle-shaped crystals of calcium oxalate) which can puncture the skin causing irritation and blisters similar to poison ivy in sensitive people. The reactions are generally less severe than those of poison ivy.

The leaves sometimes turn a decorative bright red in the fall.

=== Flowers and berries ===
The flowers are small and greenish, produced in inconspicuous clusters in late spring, and mature in late summer or early fall into small hard purplish-black berries 5 to 7 mm (3/16 to 1/4 in) diameter. These berries contain toxic amounts of oxalic acid and have been known to cause kidney damage and death to humans. The berries are not toxic to birds and provide an important winter food source for many bird species.

== Cultivation and uses ==
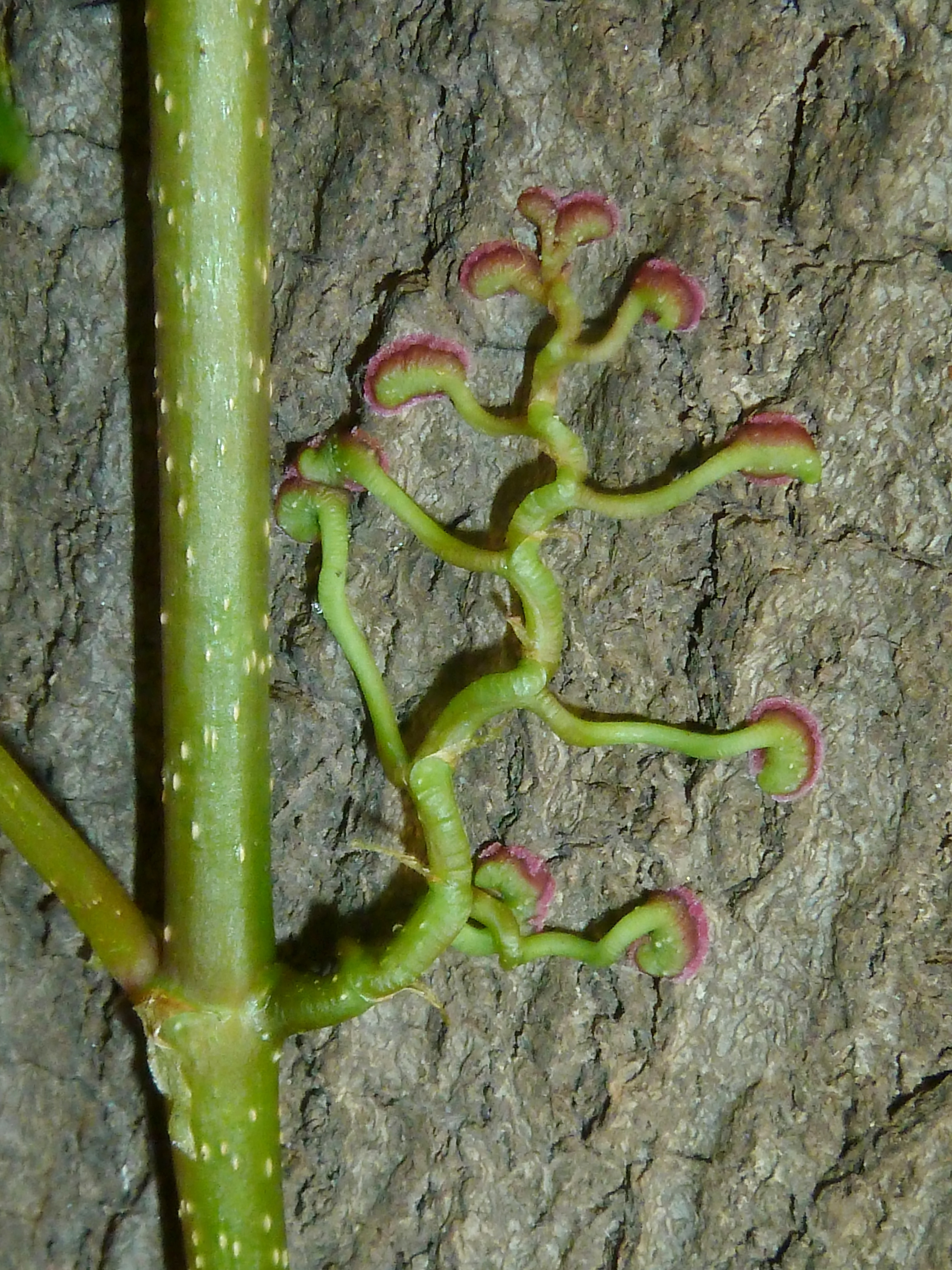
Climbing roots with adhesive pads, which are absent in P. vitacea

Parthenocissus quinquefolia is grown as an ornamental plant, because of its ability to rapidly cover walls and buildings, and its deep red to burgundy fall (autumn) foliage. It can easily be propagated by stem cuttings taken in spring.

It is frequently seen covering telephone poles or trees. It may kill other plants it covers by shading its support and thus limiting the supporting plants' ability to photosynthesize. With its aggressive growth, it can overburden slower-growing understory trees with its weight, damaging them. Its ability to propagate via its extensive root system makes it difficult to eradicate.

Parthenocissus quinquefolia can be used as a shading vine for buildings on masonry walls. Because the vine, like its relative P. tricuspidata (Boston ivy), adheres to the surface by disks rather than penetrating roots, it does not harm the masonry but will keep a building cooler by shading the wall surface during the summer. As with ivy, ripping the plant from the wall will leave the adhesive disks behind. If the plant clings to fragile surfaces it can first be killed by severing the vine from the root. The adhesive pads will then eventually deteriorate and release their grip.

The plant should be trimmed regularly to keep it from growing into areas where it is not wanted. If allowed to penetrate into the wall of a frame house, it will grow upward within the wall until it finds a place to emerge.

== Invasive status ==
Initially cultivated as an ornamental, Parthenocissus quinquefolia escaped from gardens to become naturalized and invasive around the globe. According to the Global Biodiversity Information Facility, as of 2025, the plant has become established on all continents except Antarctica.

In the United Kingdom, Parthenocissus quinquefolia is listed on Schedule 9 of the Wildlife and Countryside Act 1981 as an invasive non-native species. While this does not prevent it from being sold in the UK, or from being grown in gardens, the Royal Horticultural Society (RHS) encourages those who grow it to take great care with managing it and with disposing of unwanted material. The RHS also encourages gardeners to find alternative plants to grow to those listed on Schedule 9.

Parthenocissus quinquefolia is listed as an environmental weed in Australia. It is also listed as an invasive species in several countries in Europe, China, and Cuba. In 2024, the plant (along with the closely related P. inserta) was listed as an invasive alien in Switzerland, which banned its sale, gifting, renting, and import.

== See also ==
- P. inserta or P. vitacea, thicket creeper or false Virginia creeper
- P. tricuspidata or Ampelopsis veitchii, Boston ivy or Japanese creeper

== Gallery ==
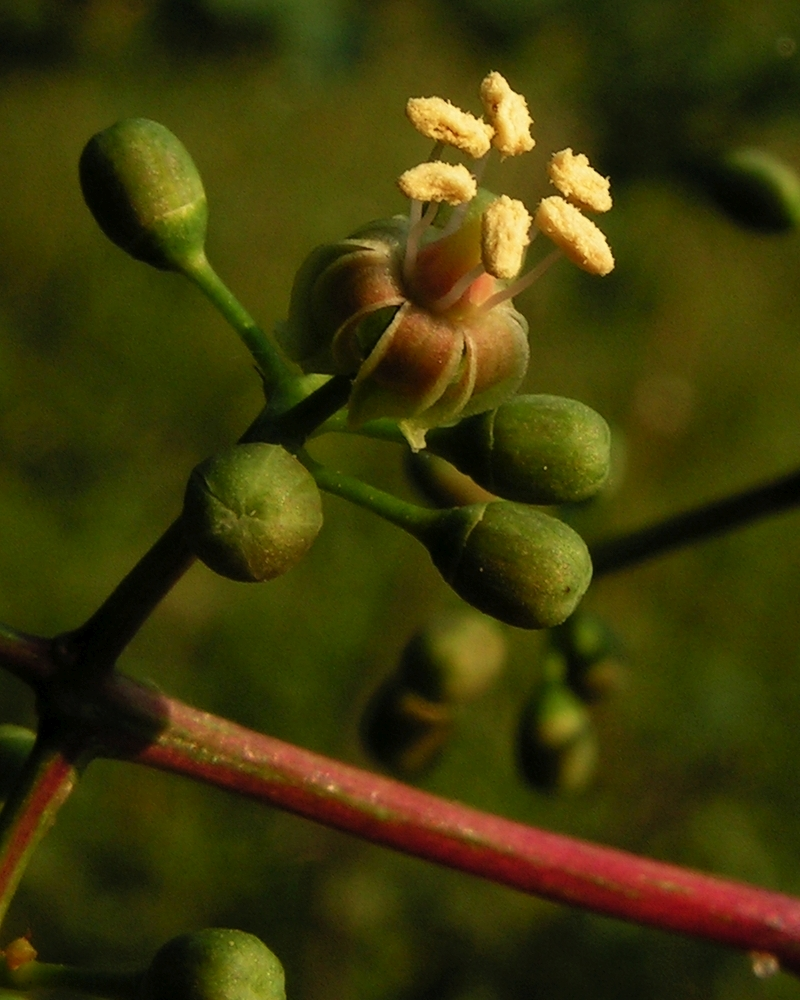
Flower

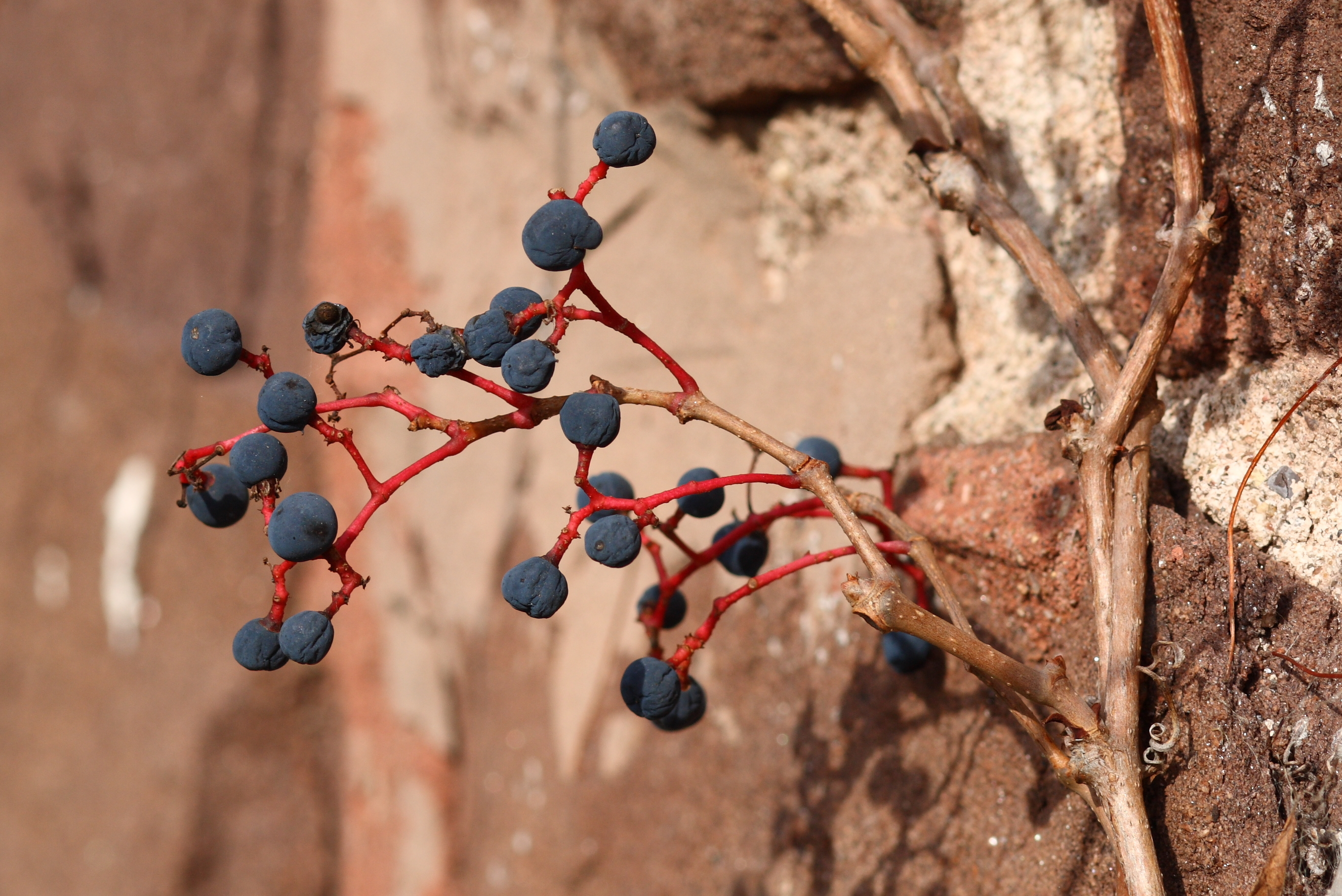
Berries after the leaves have dropped in autumn

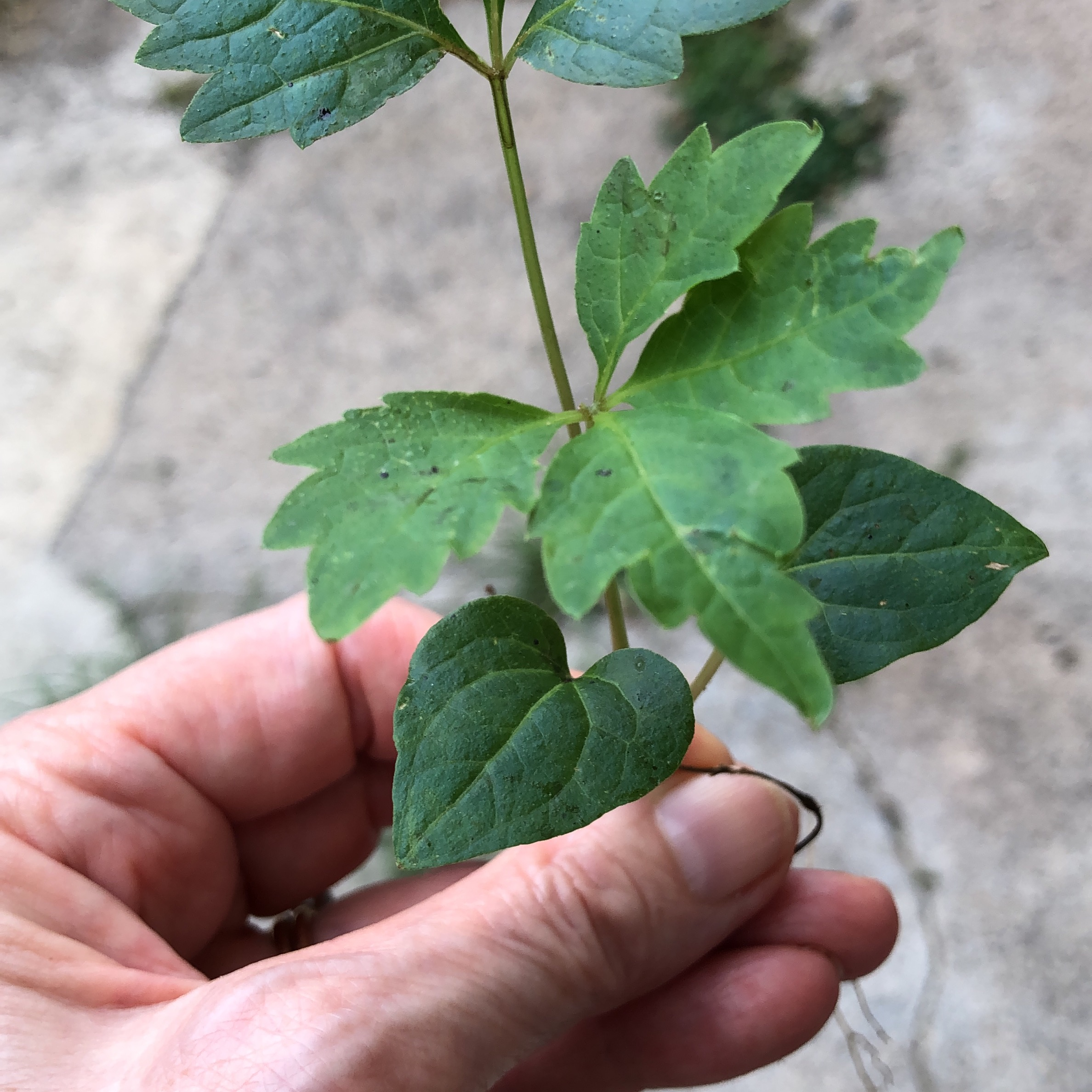
Seedling with heart-shaped cotyledon leaves

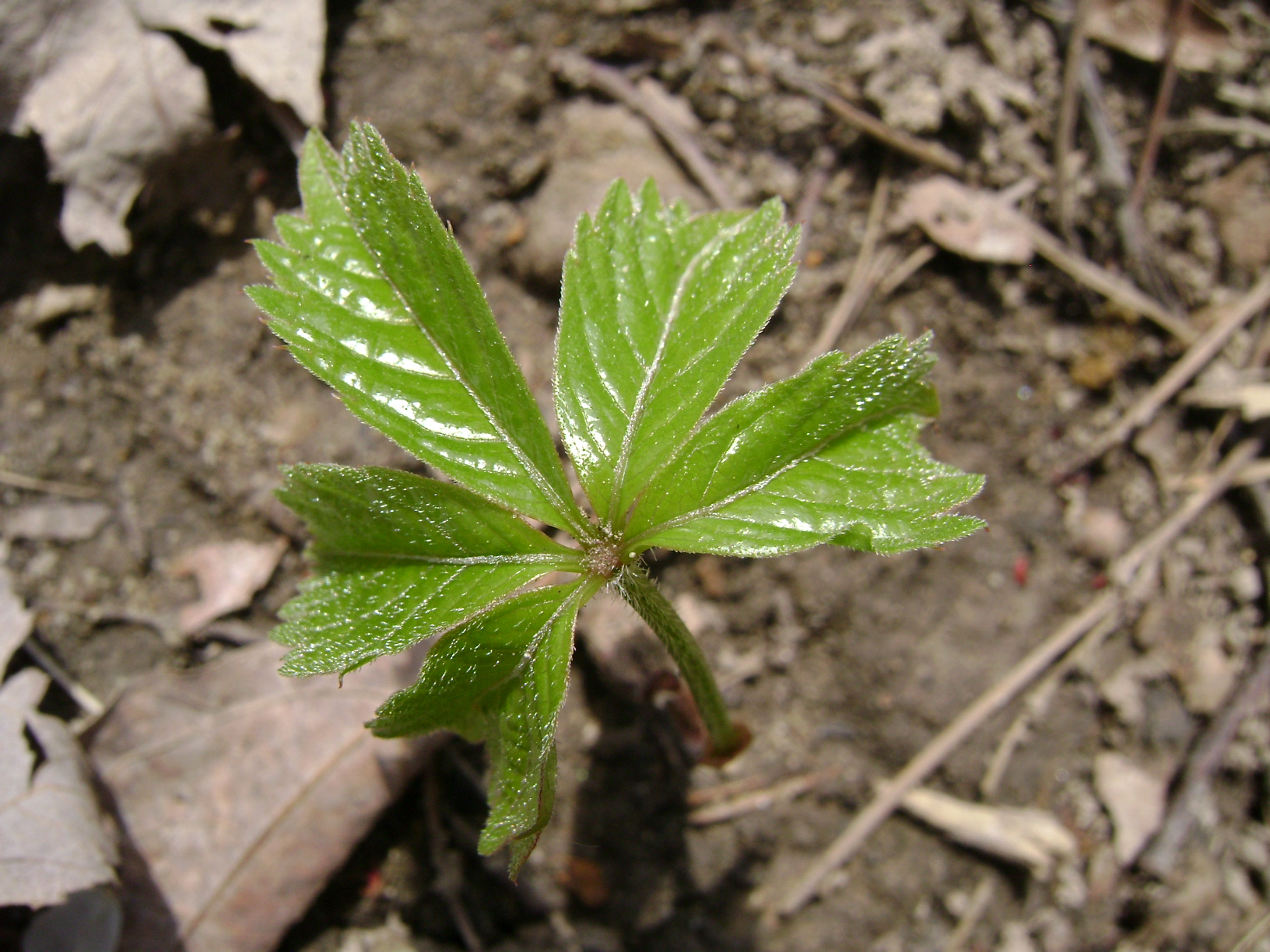
Emerging leaf in spring

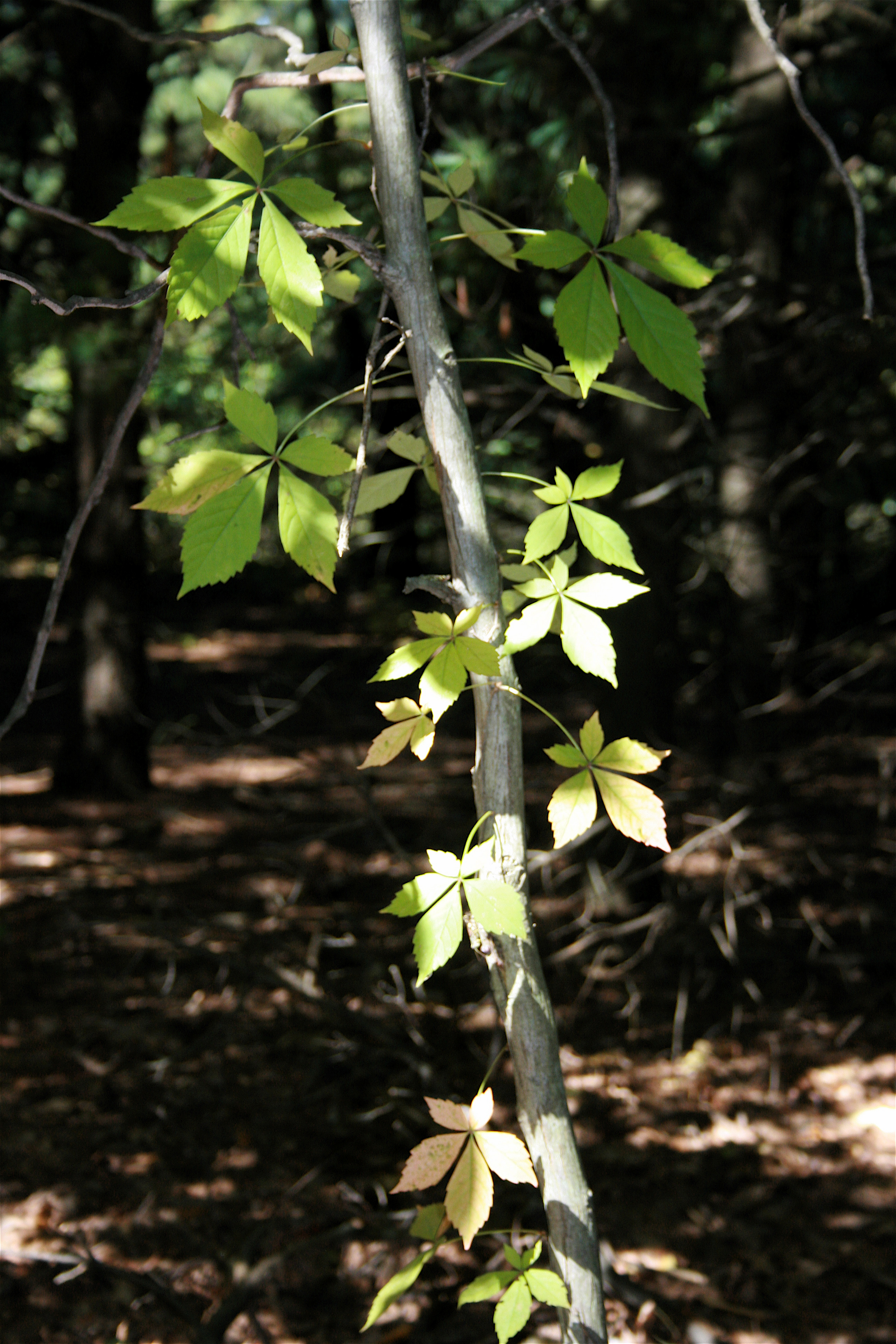
Thick vine

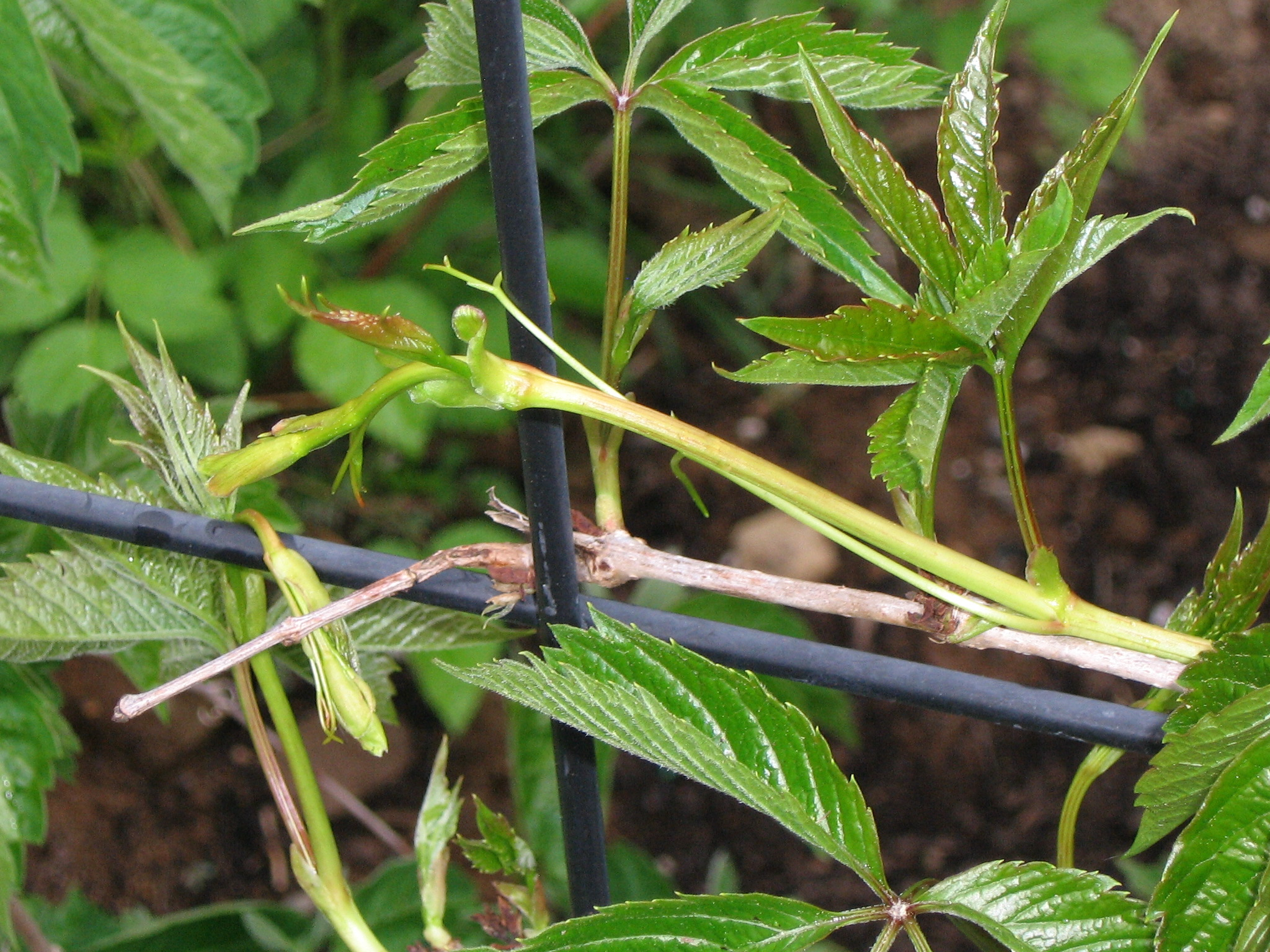
Tendrils beginning to twine around a metal trellis

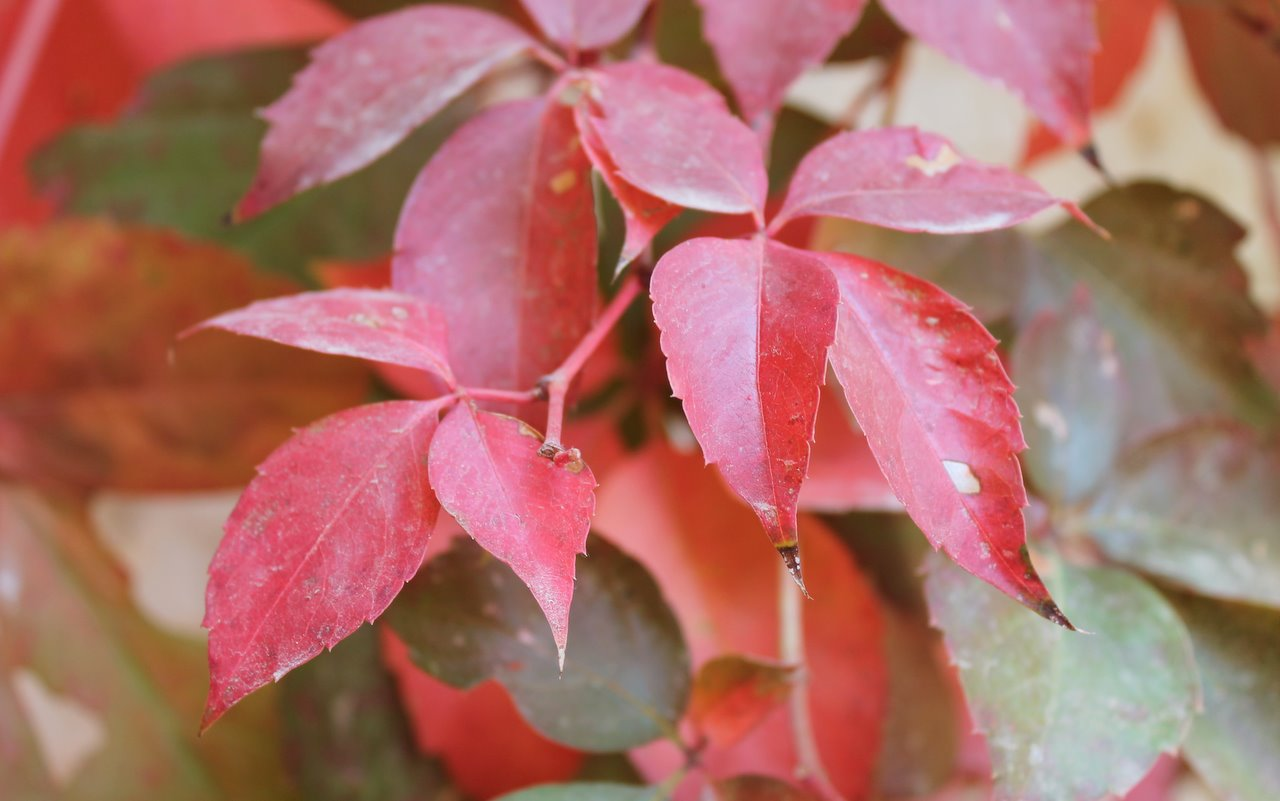
Fall color

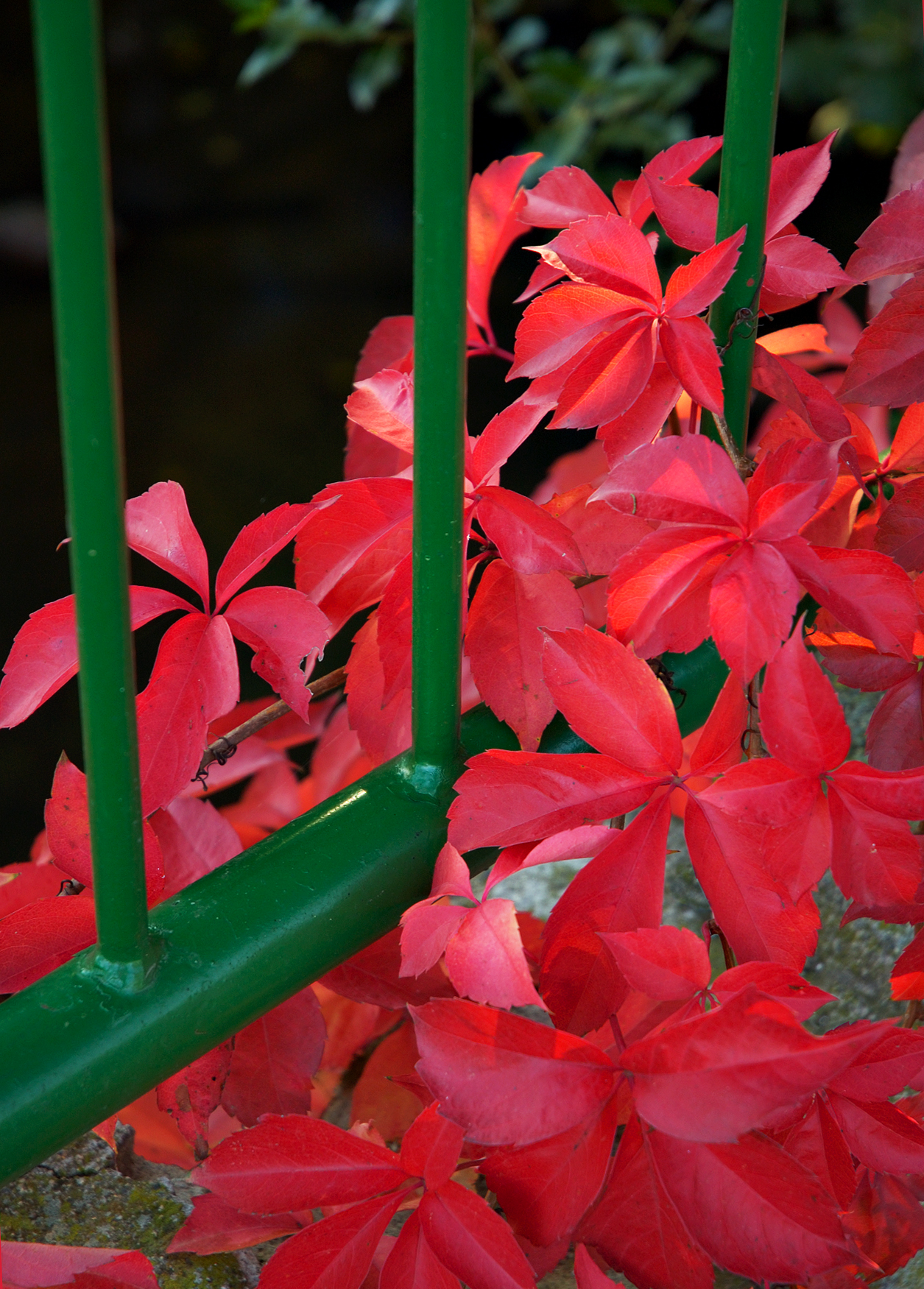
Fall color

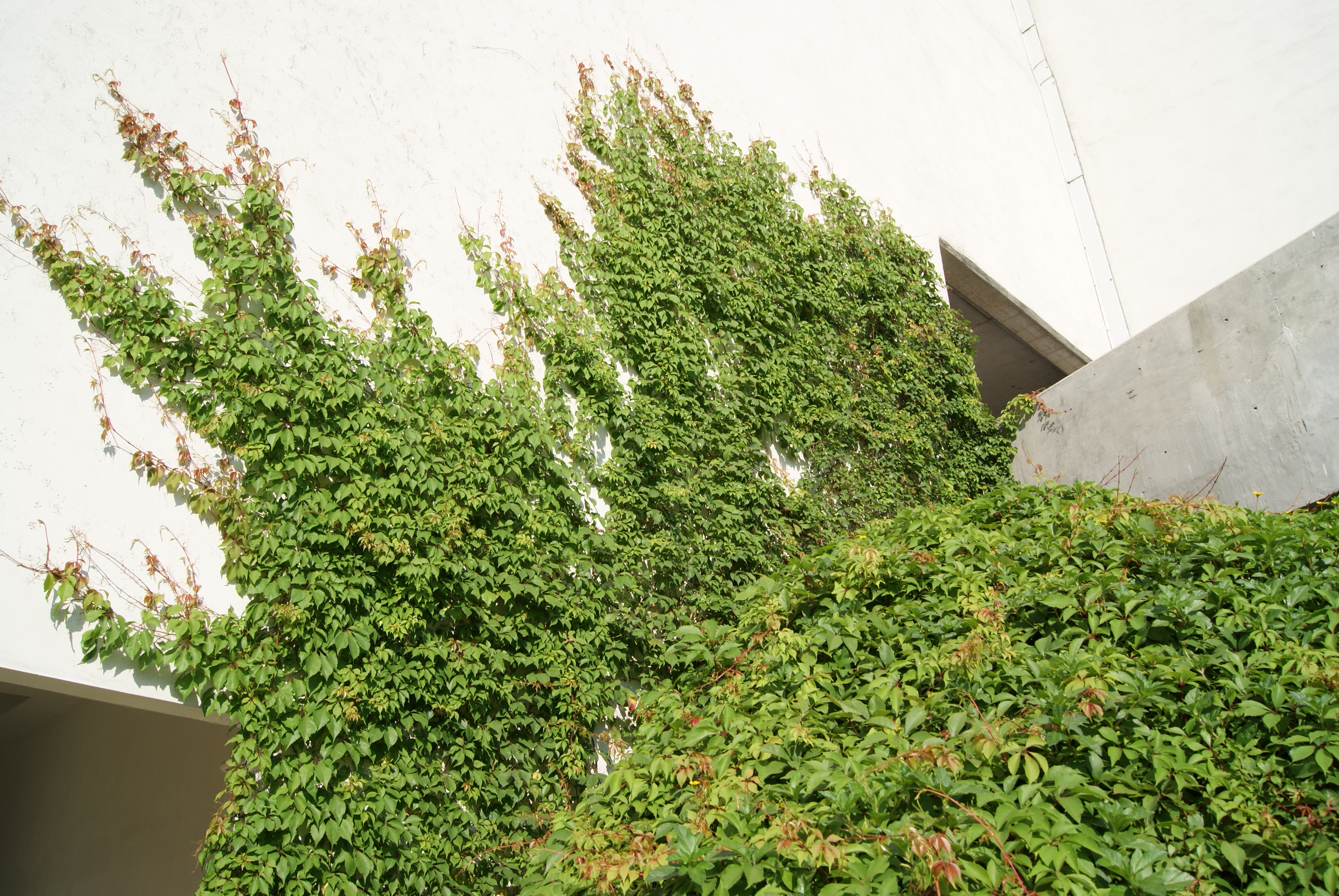
Climbing a building wall

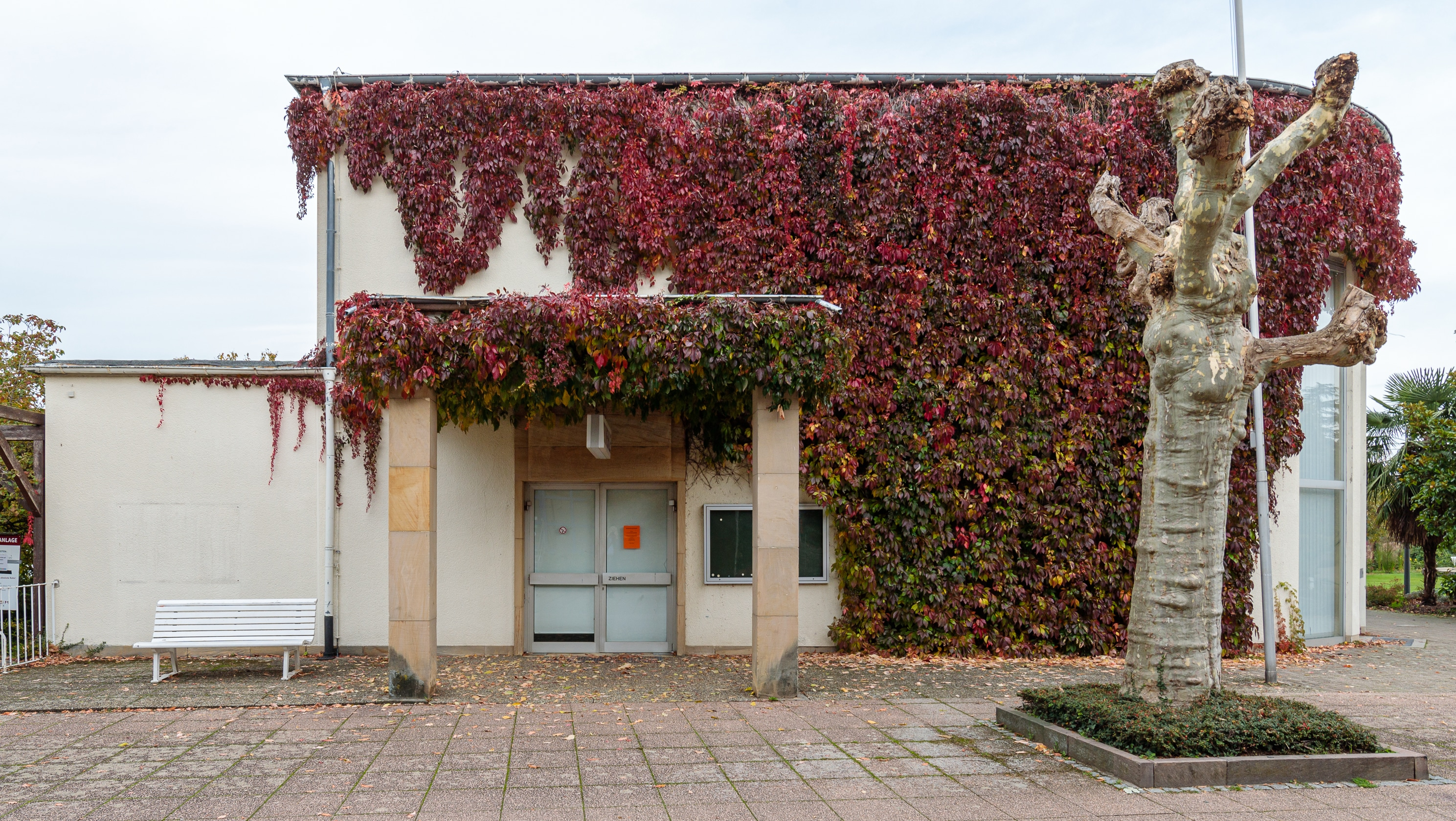
Covering a building

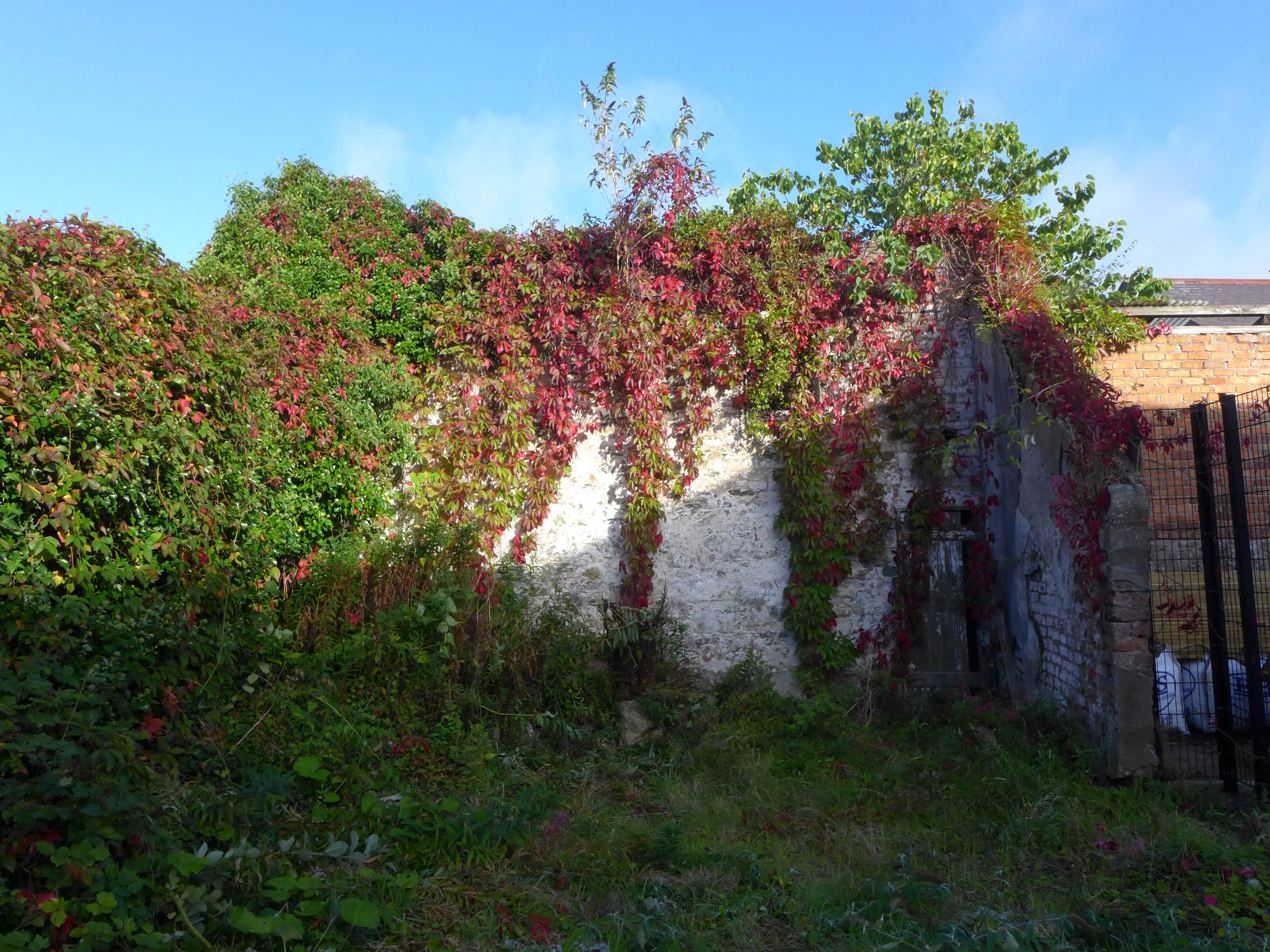
Covering a wall

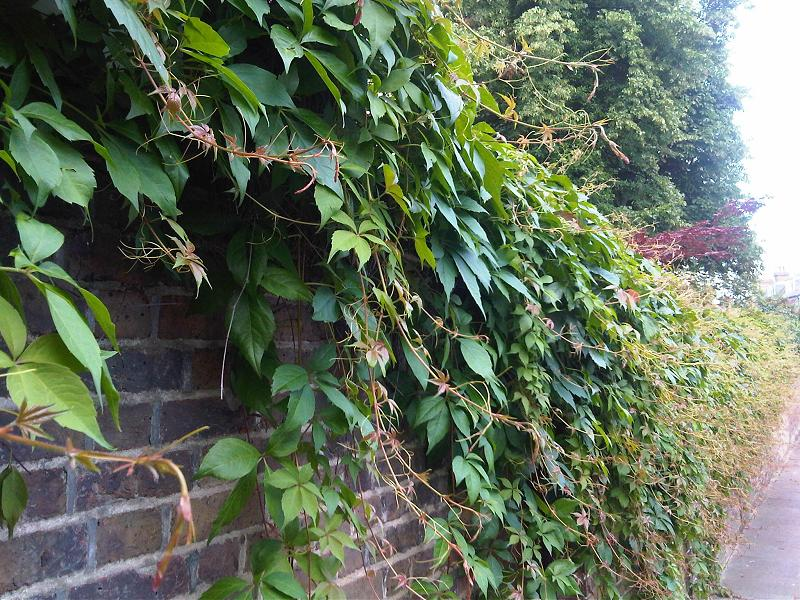
Covering a wall in London

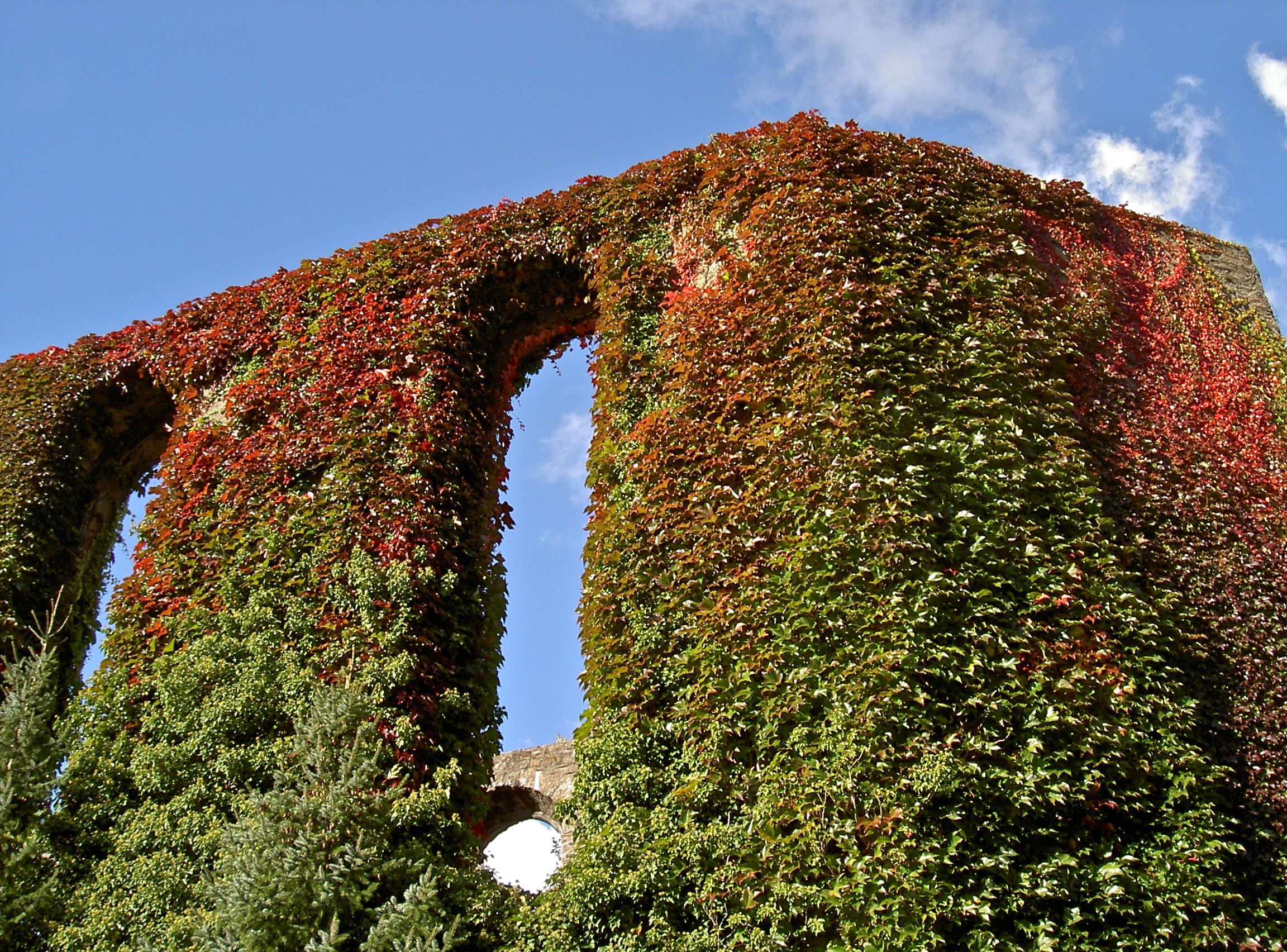
Covering a German ruin

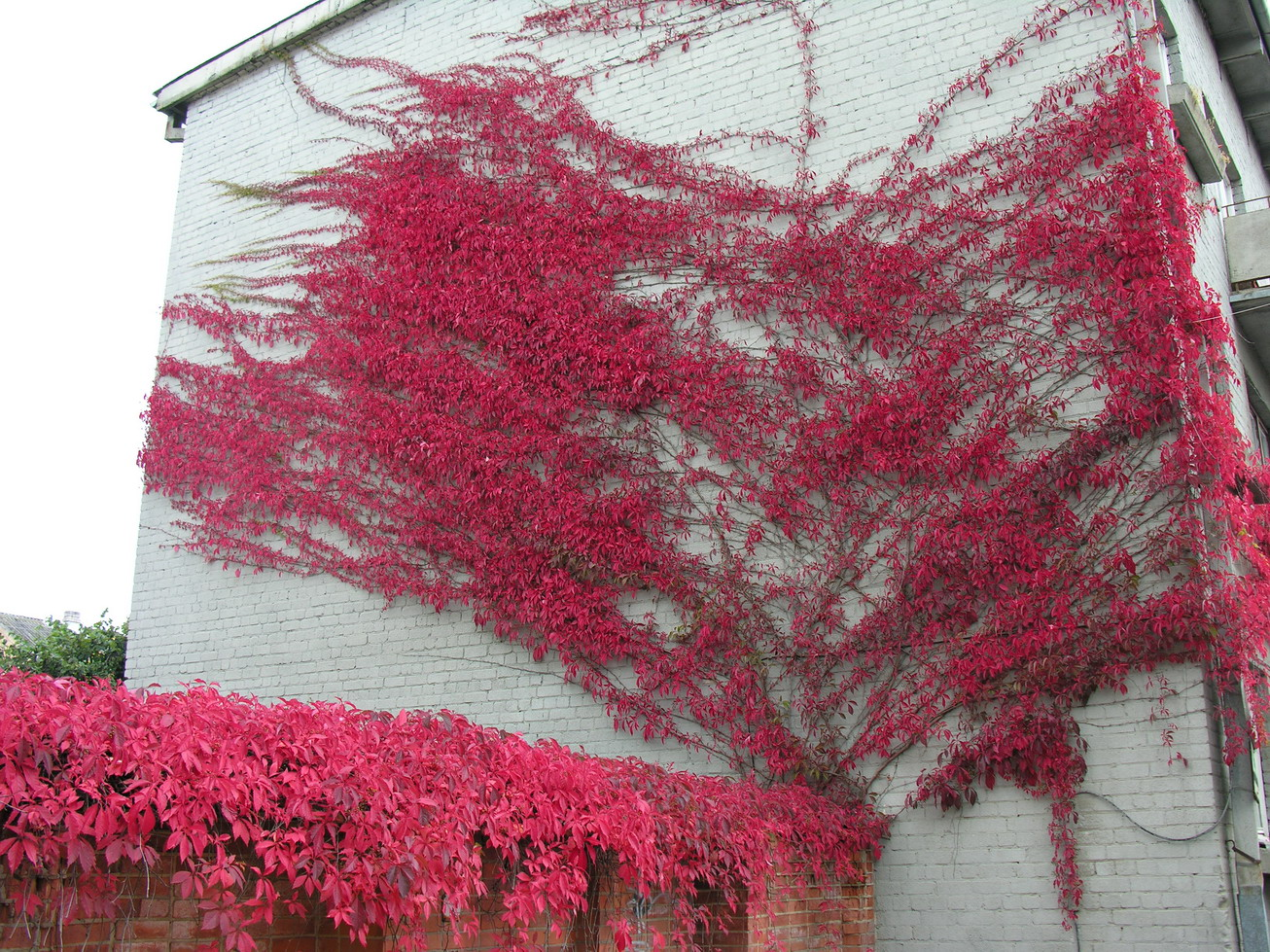
Trailing from fence to an apartment block

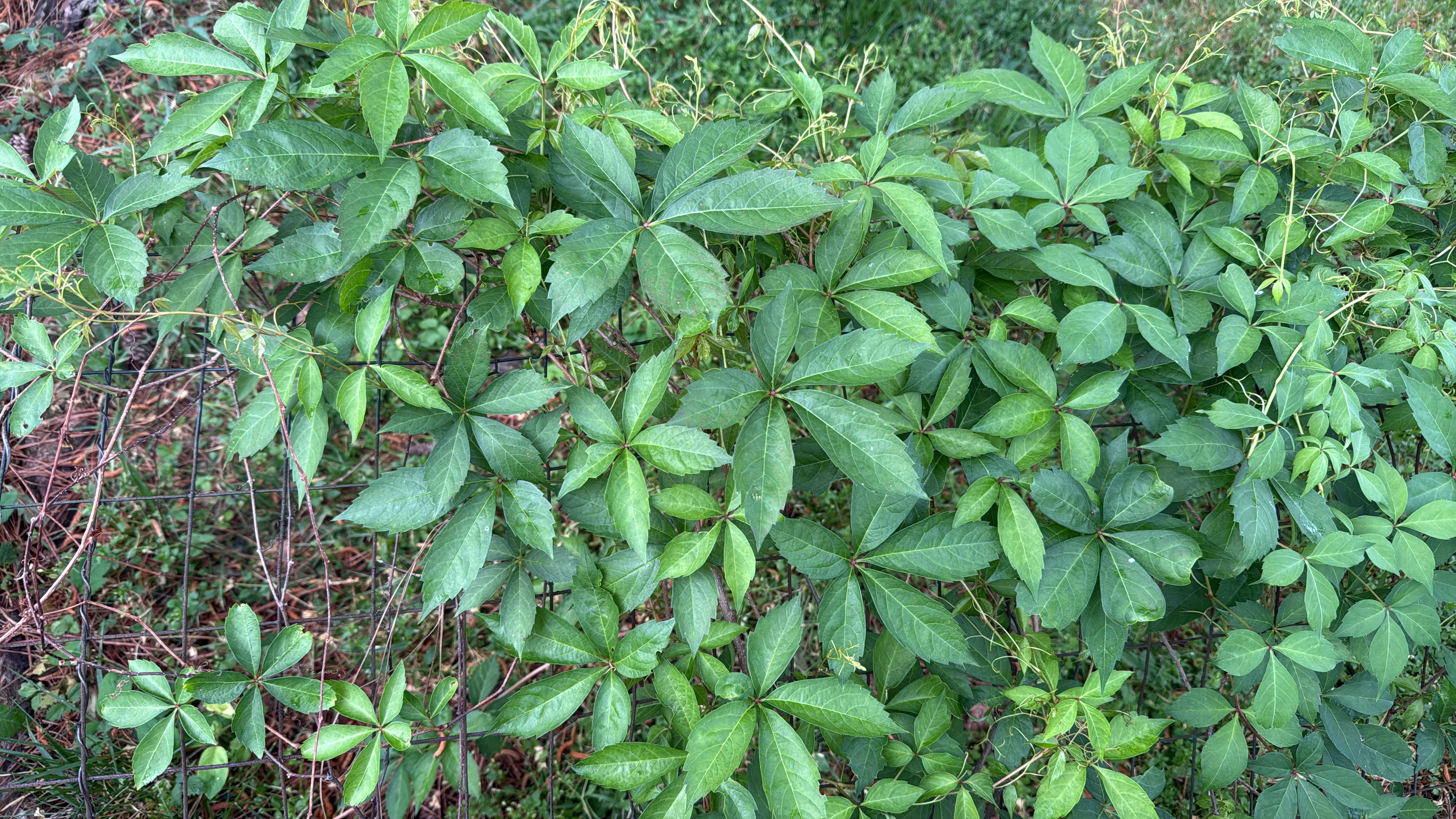
Spread out vines, mixed with Japanese Honeysuckle
