= Osiedle ZUS =

Residential estate in Łódź, Poland

- Osiedle
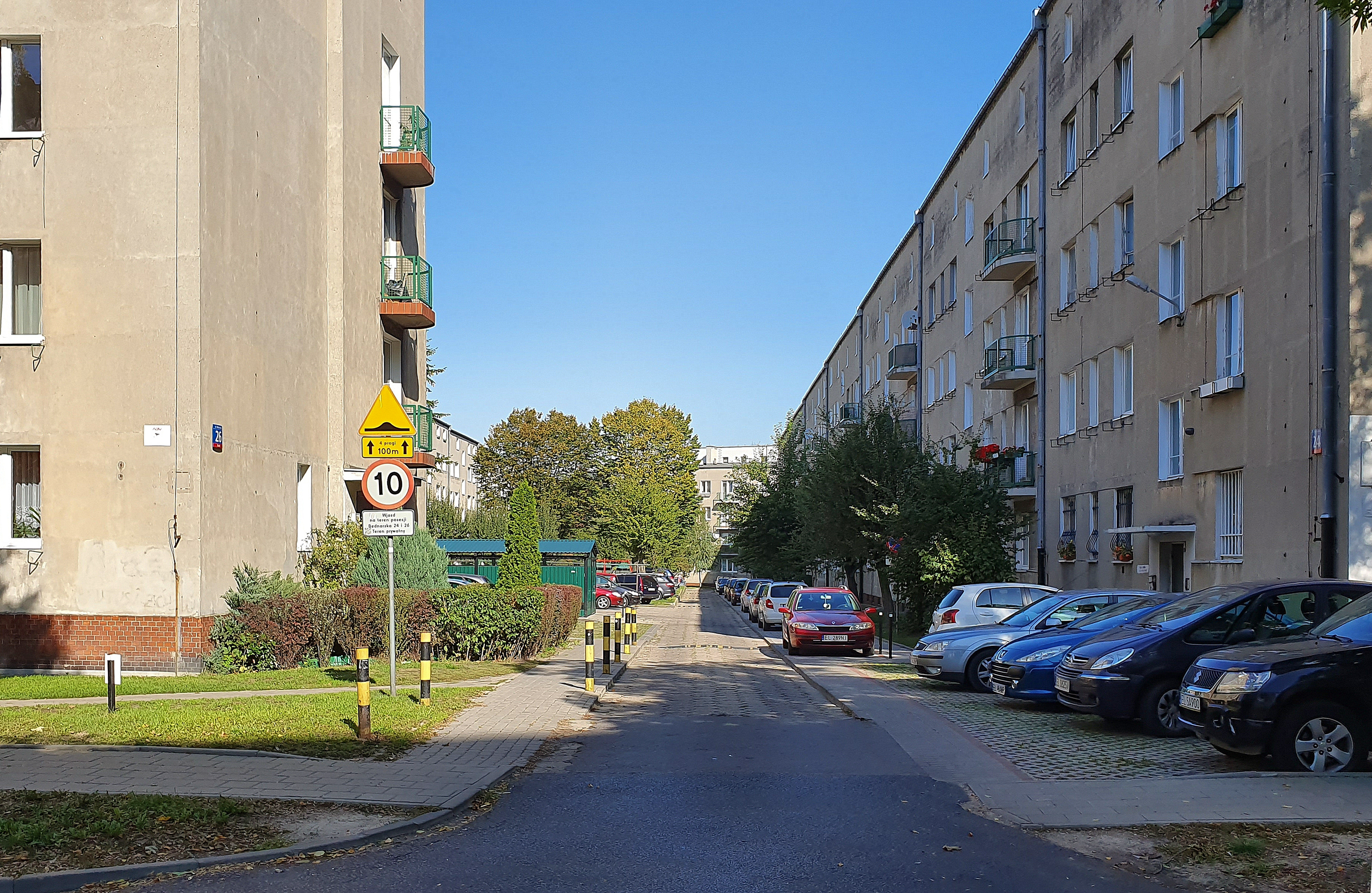
- Residential blocks at 24 and 26 Bednarska Street, part of the "clerical quarter" (September 2019)
- Interactive map of Osiedle ZUS
- Coordinates: 51°44′02.3″N 19°27′47.1″E
- Country: Poland
- Voivodeship: Łódź Voivodeship
- City: Łódź
- Established: 1932
- Time zone: UTC+1 (CET)
  - Summer (DST): UTC+2 (CEST)

Osiedle ZUS (also known as ZUS Clerical-Workers' Colony in Łódź, originally Z.U.P.U. Clerical-Workers' Estate/Colony in Łódź) is a small residential estate in the northern part of the former Górna district of Łódź, within the northern section of the Łódź Municipal Information System area of Kurak. It is bounded by the streets Bednarska, Unicka, Sanocka, and Adolf Dygasiński. The estate comprises seven multi-family blocks embodying International Style within the modernist style, constructed between 1930 and 1932 by the Building-Housing Association of the Social Insurance Institution (Zakład Ubezpieczeń Społecznych, ZUS).

== History ==
=== Background ===
==== Estate design ====
During Poland's interwar period, Łódź faced a growing housing shortage. In 1930, the ZUS Design Office in Warsaw developed a plan under architect Jan Kukulski's leadership, as part of ZUS' nationwide housing initiative. The project aimed to build a modern residential estate for employees of Łódź's insurance institutions within the block defined by Bednarska Street, the then-planned Unicka Street, Nowo Pabianicka Street (renamed Sanocka Street between 1933 and 1940 and post-World War II), and Adolf Dygasiński Street (existing by around 1910 and likely named in 1930). The roughly trapezoidal, 7-hectare site was to be bisected by a new street (Hetman Stefan Żółkiewski), dividing it asymmetrically into a larger western "workers' quarter" and a smaller eastern "clerical quarter". The plan envisioned 12 residential blocks and a central park in the western section, with two blocks in the eastern section. As the land was privately owned, the ZUS Building-Housing Association purchased it. Some sources attribute the design to Józef Szanajca, a ZUS staff architect from between 1929 and 1933, though Jakub Zasina disputes this, noting Szanajca's signature is absent from the estate's plans in the State Archives in Łódź.

A key design goal was to vary apartment sizes and standards to suit workers and clerical staff, with rent tied to size and comfort. However, high rents undermined the aim of housing workers' families; in Łódź, only 22 of 297 "workers' quarter" apartments (7%) housed such families, with most occupied by clerical families, blurring the intended social divide despite differing apartment standards. Standardized finishes and fittings were used to reduce construction costs.

==== 1930–1945 ====
Financial constraints limited the project's scope, with only 7 of 14 planned blocks built between 1930 and 1932, totaling 514 apartments. These included two 200-meter-long, four-story blocks with open courtyards at 24 and 26 Bednarska Street in the "clerical quarter", and five in the "workers' quarter" at 6 and 10 Adolf Dygasiński Street, and 20, 22, and 24 Sanocka Street (formerly Nowo Pabianicka Street). Apartments at 24 Bednarska Street and 26 were larger and more luxurious, with 36 featuring three rooms, a kitchen, bathroom, pantry, and 85 m² of space, some including a servant's room. They had coal stoves, gas water heaters by Siemens, toilets, parquet flooring, and brass-fitted doors and windows.

All blocks featured Łódź's first double-glazed (Swedish-style) windows, panel interior doors, balconies above the ground floor, sinks, ventilated under-sink cabinets, coal cellars in the basement, and attic laundries and bathrooms for apartments with only toilets. Post-war, attics were converted into apartments and sold. "Workers' quarter" blocks had ground-floor bathhouses in gallery sections, with galleries and stairwell entrances sheltered by glass or reinforced concrete canopies. Roofs were covered with bituminous waterproofing. The estate was enclosed by a steel mesh fence, later overgrown with Virginia creeper, with gates locked nightly by the caretaker.

Construction included local water supply, sewerage, and electricity distribution networks. Until the 1950s, the estate had its own well in the ZUS Park; later, it connected to municipal systems, including district heating. Internal roads, paved with cobblestones, remain intact.

In 1930, Unicka and Hetman Stefan Żółkiewski streets were laid out, followed between 1933 and 1934 by a nearly 3-hectare park designed by Łódź landscape architect Stefan Rogowicz, larger than planned due to the reduced number of blocks. Initially named Z.U.P.U. (Zakład Ubezpieczeń Pracowników Umysłowych, or Clerical Workers' Insurance Institution), residents jokingly said they lived "in the soup" (w zupie). In 1934, after five insurance bodies merged into ZUS, it became Osiedle Z.U.S. (now Osiedle ZUS), with the park named accordingly.

Residents followed "House Order Regulations" set by the administrator, governing neighbor relations and aesthetics. In 1939, due to its high living standards and "intelligentsia" character, Germans began evictions, starting with Dr. Feliks Iwicki, a former Polish Military Organisation member and insurance doctor, on 13 December. In February 1940, mass evictions cleared the estate within hours, with residents sent to a transit camp at the former Gliksman factory on 4 Wiesenstraße Street (later Łąkowa Street) and then to Końskie. The vacated apartments, initially intended for settlers from Estonia and Courland, housed Wehrmacht families, with a Ordnungspolizei post established at 24 Bednarska Street.

==== Post-1945 ====
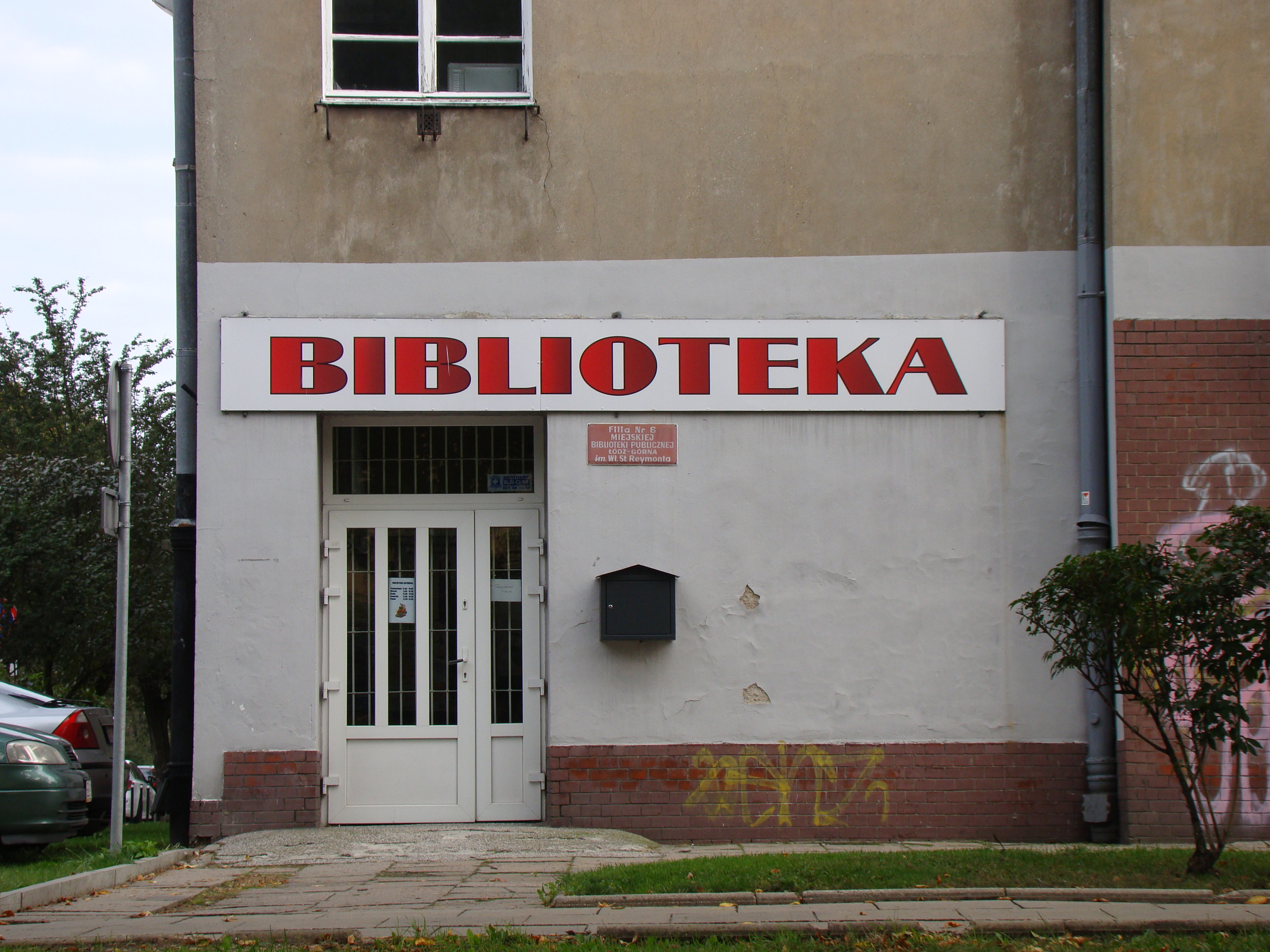
Public library on the ground floor of 24 Bednarska Street, viewed from Sanocka Street (September 2014)

In 1973, despite protests, the Górna District Council chairman, Bednarczyk, ordered the removal of the estate's mesh fencing. Residents were told, "Sanacja blocks won't fence themselves off!". Sławomir Arabski later called it "a great injustice". Antczak and Warzecha suggest this enabled a 20 September 1976 robbery at 24 Bednarska Street, where Andrzej Pietrzak murdered two women physicians; he was executed on 6 February 1978.

In the 2000s, modernization altered the blocks' appearance – administrator upgrades (e.g., thermal insulation, door replacements) and resident modifications (e.g., replacing wooden windows with PVC, adding shutters and satellite dishes) – partly eroded their original style. Łódź's estate retained more authenticity than a similar ZUS project in Lviv, with the "clerical quarter" less altered than the "workers' quarter".

On 2 April 2017, the estate gained its first permanent public transport link with bus line no. 72 along Bednarska Street, operated by the Municipal Transport Company, connecting Independence Avenue to Janów. Stops were added near Unicka Street and 42 Bednarska Street.

=== Notable residents ===
- Józef Janicki, deputy director of Komunalna kasa oszczędności – 24 Bednarska Street, interwar period
- Feliks Iwicki, physician, ex-Polish Military Organisation member, co-founder of RKS Skra Warszawa – 24 Bednarska Street (listed at 1 Unicka Street pre-war), 1930s to 13 December 1939
- Leszek Kołakowski, philosopher – 24 or 26 Bednarska Street, 1930s to World War II (childhood with aunt, an insurance doctor) and between 1945 and 1949
- Alfred Wiłkomirski, violinist, conductor, educator (with family, including daughter Wanda Wiłkomirska) – 26 Bednarska Street, early 1930s
- Dawid Sierakowiak, Łódź Ghetto prisoner, diarist – 22 Sanocka Street, 1930s to 1940 ghetto relocation
- Władysław Kocuper, State Police commissioner, Łódź County commander from 8 April 1935 – 24 Bednarska Street
- Hanna Ożogowska, writer, translator, post-war director of Łódź Pedagogical High School – 26 Bednarska Street, post-war to 1951
- Zygmunt Zahorski, mathematician, professor at University of Łódź and Silesian University of Technology – 24 or 26 Bednarska Street, 1948–1970
- Zygmunt Charzyński, mathematician, professor at Łódź University of Technology and University of Łódź – 24 or 26 Bednarska Street, post-war
- Karol Głogowski, lawyer, Polish People's Republic opposition activist – 24 Bednarska Street, stairwell E, post-war
- Wojciech Marczewski, film director – 26 Bednarska Street, post-war
- Scoutmaster Władysława Matuszewska, Łódź Polish Scouting and Guiding Association commander – 24 or 26 Bednarska Street, post-war
- Tadeusz Szczerbic, lawyer, writer, World Association of Home Army Soldiers member (with family, including Joanna Szczerbic and Michał Szczerbic) – 24 Bednarska Street, from 1950s
- Magdalena Tesławska, costume designer (with family: father Konstanty, Miastoprojekt-Łódź director; brother Marek, architect) – 26 Bednarska Street, post-war; parents from 1930s
- Jarosław Warzecha, journalist, playwright, prose writer – 24 or 26 Bednarska Street, post-war
- Mieczysław Woźniakowski, Łódź School District curator, Łódź National Council member – 24 or 26 Bednarska Street, post-war

=== Street name changes ===
1930–1933	1933–1939	1940	1940–1945	Post-1945	Notes and sources
Bednarska Street		Kopernikusstraße	Ostpreußenstraße	Bednarska Street	Existed since ~1910
Adolf Dygasiński Street		Kantstraße	Samland Straße	Adolf Dygasiński Street	Previously unnamed, likely named in 1930
Nowo Pabianicka Street	Sanocka Street	Nietzscherstraße	Kurlandstraße	Sanocka Street	Existed pre-1915
Unicka Street		Grimmstraße	Rominterstraße	Unicka Street	Laid out and named in 1930
Hetman Stefan Żółkiewski Street		Helgastraße	Masurenstraße	Hetman Stefan Żółkiewski Street	Laid out and named in 1930

== Architecture ==
=== Style ===
The blocks reflect International Style within modernism, akin to Germany's Bauhaus and Le Corbusier's French works. The design positioned them as a "self-contained crystallizing element" and a "dominant spatial feature" in Łódź's urban landscape. Mostly aligned north-south, the "clerical quarter" features long, enclosed blocks with courtyards, lacking standalone public buildings, resembling Frankfurt's 1927 Riedhof estate. Structures include stairwell, gallery, or hybrid stairwell-gallery designs, using Le Corbusier's basic forms. Facades lack ornamentation, with aesthetics derived from balanced use of plasterwork, ceramic brick, wood, and glass.

=== Apartment structure ===
Rooms	Area (m²)	Type	Number	Source
Room, kitchen nook, toilet	24	Workers'	120	
Room, kitchen nook, bathroom with a toilet	28	Clerical	16	
2 rooms, kitchen nook, toilet	38–45	Workers'	188	
2 rooms, kitchen, pantry, bathroom with a toilet	52–54	Clerical	154	
3 rooms, kitchen, pantry, bathroom with a toilet	85	Clerical	36	

Gallery and hybrid blocks also included a vestibule.

== In culture ==
- In 1959, Hanna Ożogowska (resident until 1951) published Tajemnica zielonej pieczęci (The Mystery of the Green Seal), a youth novel set in the estate, with characters Bartek, Stefan, and Wiktor inspired by residents, including caretaker Chybała from 24 Bednarska Street.
- In 2013, Tadeusz Morawski, an electronics professor and palindrome writer, published a feuilleton recounting Professor Michał Tadeusiewicz's post-war life at 24 and 26 Bednarska Street.
- In 2018, Bednarska Street served as a filming location (standing in for Warsaw's Ochota) for Dom Tułaczy (House of Wanderers), Mariko Bobrik's debut feature, premiered in 2019.

== Buildings ==
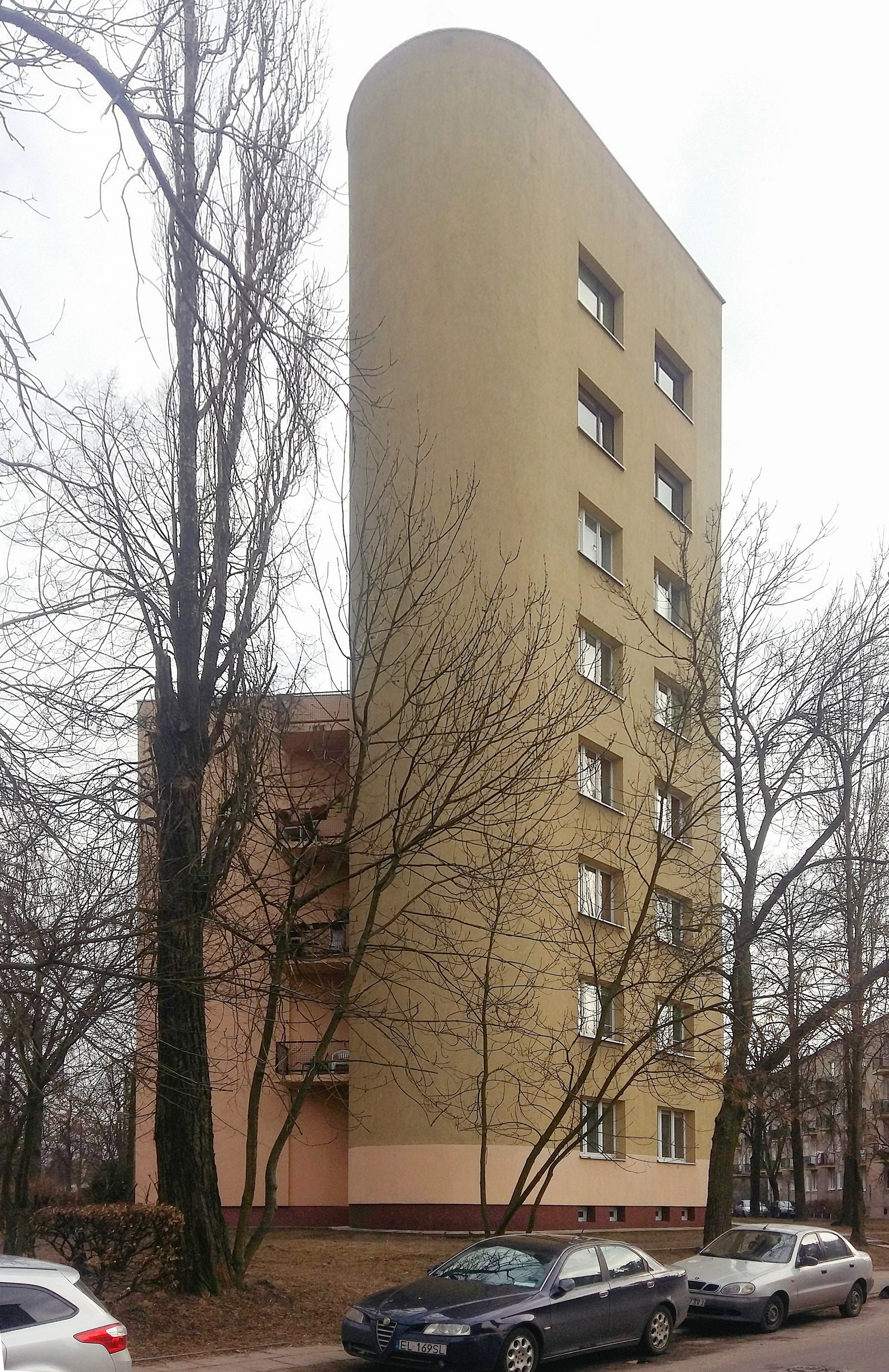
Stairwell block at 6 Adolf Dygasiński Street (March 2018)

=== Workers' quarter ===
- 6 Adolf Dygasiński Street – four-story stairwell block with adapted attic, featuring an eight-story rounded water tower (originally residential only at the base, fully converted pre-World War II)
- 8 Adolf Dygasiński Street/22 Sanocka Street – four-story stairwell block (22 Sanocka Street wing: five-story gallery block)
- 10 Adolf Dygasiński Street – four-story stairwell block
- 20 Sanocka Street – four-story gallery block
- 24 Sanocka Street – four-story stairwell block (parallel wing: five-story gallery block)

=== Clerical quarter ===
- 24 Bednarska Street – four-story stairwell block
- 26 Bednarska Street – four-story stairwell block
- 34/36 Sanocka Street (east-west wing of 26 Bednarska Street) – four-story stairwell block

As of August 2016, 24 and 26 Bednarska Street were listed in Łódź's municipal heritage registry.

== See also ==
- Bednarska Street, Łódź

== Bibliography ==
- Straßenverzeichnis von Litzmannstadt [Street Directory of Litzmannstadt] (PDF) (in German). Litzmannstadt (Łódź): Oberbürgermeister von Litzmannstadt Statistisches Amt, Verlag der Buchhandlung S. Seipelt G. m. b. H. 1941. Archived from the original (PDF) on 2018-11-16.
- Zasina, Jakub (2013). "Modernistyczne osiedle mieszkaniowe ZUS w Łodzi" [Modernist housing estate of the Social Insurance Institution (ZUS) in Łódź]. Gdy przypadek staje się regułą. Wariantowanie przekształceń elewacji zabytkowego modernistycznego osiedla ZUS w Łodzi z wykorzystaniem modelowania proceduralnego i badań sondażowych [When Chance Becomes the Rule. Variations in Facade Transformations of Łódź’s Historic Modernist ZUS Estate Using Procedural Modeling and Surveys] (in Polish).
- Żumański, Antoni, ed. (1937–1939). Księga adresowa miasta Łodzi i województwa łódzkiego z informatorami... Rocznik 1937–1939 (PDF) (in Polish). Łódź: Wydawnictwo Księgi Adresowej. Archived from the original (PDF) on 2017-04-06.
