= Bednarska Street, Łódź =

Street in Łódź, Poland

Bednarska Street
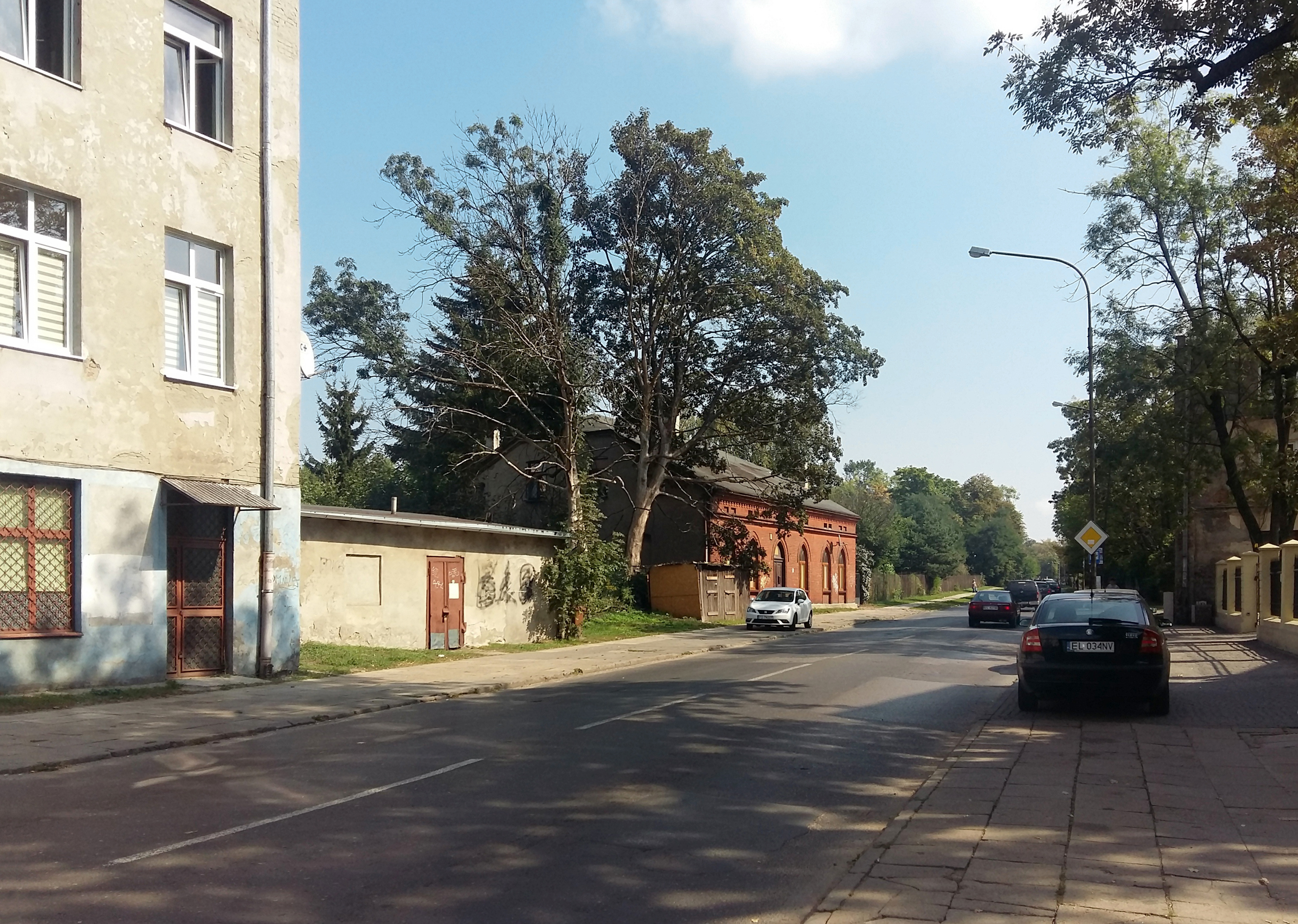
- Bednarska Street from the side of Pabianicka Street

- Location within Poland
- Part of: Górniak, Chojny, Kurak
- Length: 0.8 km (0.50 mi)
- Location: Łódź
- Coordinates: 51°44′07.8″N 19°28′11.6″E

Bednarska Street is a street located in the northern part of the former Górna district of Łódź, forming a boundary that separates three Urban Information System areas: Górniak from Chojny (on the section from Rzgowska Street to Unicka Street) and Górniak from Kurak (on the section from Unicka Street to Pabianicka Street). It connects Rzgowska Street with Pabianicka Street and serves as an extension of Wólczańska Street, which was established much earlier. The properties on the northern, odd-numbered side of the street are situated in Górniak, while the properties on the southern, even-numbered side are located in Chojny (between Rzgowska and Unicka streets) and in Kurak (between Unicka and Pabianicka streets).

Bednarska Street begins at the intersection with Rzgowska Street, initially heading southwest. After the intersection with Julian Korsak Street, it turns northwest and ends at the intersection with Pabianicka Street. Its northern extension, beyond the intersection with Pabianicka Street, is Wólczańska Street. The name of the street, derived from the noun bednarz (meaning cooper, a craftsman who makes wooden vessels), has no geographical justification.

The street holds the status of a county road (no. 1105E). (Note: Along with Wólczańska Street.) It is two-way along its entire length. It passes through Legionów Park, which includes the former factory park of Ernst Leonhardt (on the northern, odd-numbered side of the street) and the former Social Insurance Institution park (on the southern, even-numbered side).

The initial section of the street, up to the intersection with Unicka Street (properties numbered 3–9 and 2–20), belongs to the Roman Catholic Parish of Our Lady of the Angels, while the further section (properties numbered 24–42) belongs to the Roman Catholic Parish of St. Luke the Evangelist and St. Florian.

== History ==
=== Before 1918 ===
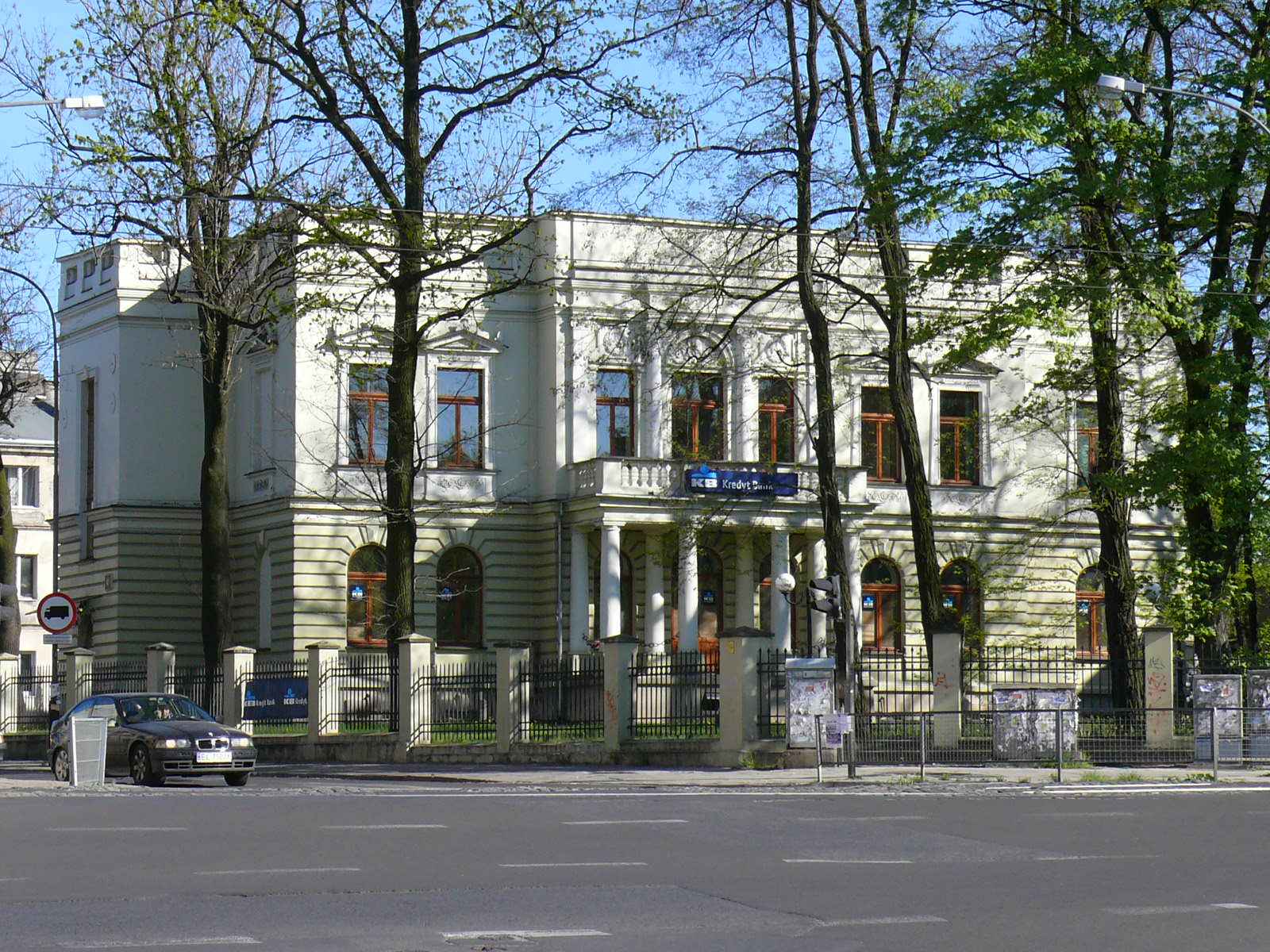
Schweikert Villa at 42 Bednarska Street – once the headquarters of Łódź's Se-ma-for, now the 17th Branch of Santander Bank Polska in Łódź – view from the intersection with Pabianicka Street

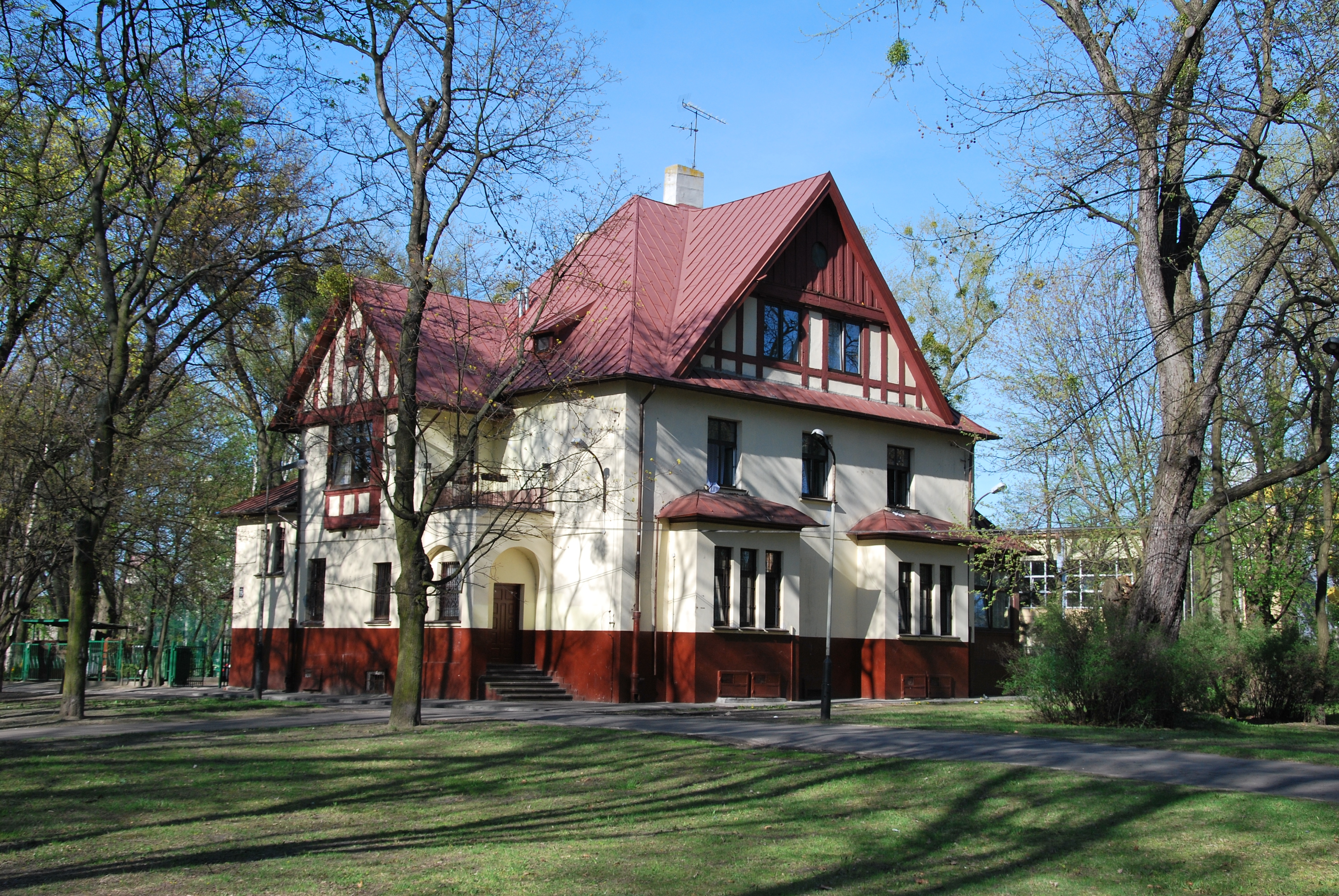
Former Wilhelm Völker villa at 15 Bednarska Street, now the location of Children's Home No. 6 named after S. Jachowicz

The approximately 800-meter-long Bednarska Street was largely laid out through former expropriated and divided agricultural colonies and settlements – Dąbrówka Mała, Chojny Nowe, and Kolonia Chojny (Chojen AB) – and in a small part (the final section) through the area of Nowy Rokicek, a compact village initially part of the Ruda estate of the Kraków chapter, later a government village, which was redeveloped and privatized in the first half of the 19th century. These areas were incorporated into the administrative boundaries of Łódź only by a decree from the Council of Ministers on 18 October 1906. They are depicted in the Plan ziemiel prisojediniennych k gorodu Łodzi (Планъ земель присоединенныхъ къ городу Лодзи, Plan of Land Added to the City of Łódź), created at a scale of 1:8400 in 1907 by surveyor Hilary Szymański. Only Pabianicka Road and Rzgowska Street are visible on this map. Bednarska Street is visible on the City of Łódź Plan prepared around 1910 and included as an appendix to the Czas. Kalendarz na Rok 1911 (Time. Calendar for the Year 1911).

As early as 1896, several years before the street was laid out, an impressive villa was built near the later intersection with Pabianicka Road. This villa became the residence of the Schweikert family – German textile manufacturers who had owned a cotton factory nearby since 1875, located on the other side of Pabianicka Road at 215 Wólczańska Street (now occupied by the Łódź University of Technology). Because the villa (now at 42 Bednarska Street) has a cartouche with the initials SI, art historian Professor Krzysztof Stefański from the University of Łódź is not entirely sure whether it was built by the Schweikert family or if they were its subsequent owners.

In 1906, German manufacturer Ernst Leonhardt from Saxony, co-owner of the nearby wool factory of the Joint-Stock Company Leonhardt – Woelker – Girbardt, established allotments for workers. These were created along the area where Bednarska Street was being laid out. The allotments, named after Stefan Błaszczyk (now at 19/21 Bednarska Street), adjoin Legionów Park on the east. They are the oldest surviving workers' allotments in Łódź. Over time, due to urbanization, the area of the allotments has significantly decreased. By the end of the first decade of the 21st century, they covered an area of 2.3 hectares and included 62 plots. The current boundaries of the allotments (as of 2017) are defined by Dorota Street (to the north and east), Bednarska Street (to the south), and the eastern boundary of properties numbered 6 to 16 on Pabianicka Street (to the west).

At 15 and 15a Bednarska Street, the Joint-Stock Company Leonhardt – Woelker – Girbardt built two nearly identical post-Art Nouveau villas for Ernst Leonhardt between 1907 and 1909, situated in a park-like setting (Leonhardt purchased part of the park reaching up to the planned Bednarska Street somewhat earlier, in 1905). The villas were occupied by Leonhardt's business partners – his brother-in-law Wilhelm Völker and Saxon Hilmar Girbardt. The private park was fenced, with two entrances from Bednarska Street (a third led from Pabianicka Road), but remained private until 1952 despite changes in ownership. It is likely that tennis courts were also built in the park along Bednarska Street before World War I, which existed there until the 1960s.

In 1911, Bednarska Street was first included in the house tariff. As of 3 October 1911, only one property on Bednarska Street was registered in the city land books – property number 4052, owned by Heinrich Haar. Two years later, additional properties were included in the house tariff: property number 4235, owned by Hugon Schäfer, and property number 5 (number 4356), owned by Emil Diesner.

During the German occupation of Łódź from 1915 to 1918, German-language names were introduced. From 1916 until the end of the occupation in 1918, Bednarska Street was named Böttcherstraße (German for cooper). After Poland regained independence, the pre-war Polish name was restored.

=== 1919–1945 ===
Just after the war, the property tariff for Bednarska Street included, in addition to the previously existing properties, the one at number 7 (mortgage number 4356), belonging to Franciszek and Juljanna Kańczucki.

In 1930, a project was developed at the Social Insurance Institution's Project Office in Warsaw, led by architect Jan Kukulski, as part of the nationwide housing initiative of the Social Insurance Institution (ZUS) undertaken by the ZUS Construction and Housing Association. The project proposed the construction of a modern residential estate for employees of Łódź's insurance institutions in the block bounded by Bednarska Street – Unicka Street (planned to be established) – Nowo Pabianicka Street (renamed Sanocka between 1933 and 1940 and after World War II) – Adolf Dygasiński Street (existing and visible on city plans as early as 1910, likely named in 1930). The trapezoidal-shaped block with an area of 7 hectares was also planned to be divided by a new street (Stefan Żółkiewski Street), thus asymmetrically splitting it into a larger western part (designated as the "workers' quarter") and a smaller eastern part (designated as the "officials' quarter"). The project included the construction of 12 residential blocks and a centrally located park in the first quarter, and 2 blocks in the second quarter. Some sources indicate that one of the designers of the Łódź buildings was Józef Szanajca (full-time ZUS designer from 1929 to 1933), though Jakub Zasina disputes this, noting that Szanajca's signature does not appear on any of the project's building plans stored in the State Archives in Łódź.

Due to limited financial resources, the technical documentation did not cover the entire project, resulting in only part of it being realized. Between 1930 and 1932, of the planned 14 blocks, 7 were built (a total of 514 apartments): (Note: Jakub Zasina, based on the work by R. Piotrowski, M. Ponikiewski, and J. Sadowski, Akcja budowlano-mieszkaniowa Zakładu Ubezpieczeń Społecznych w latach 1930–1933 (The Construction and Housing Initiative of the Social Insurance Institution in 1930–1933), published by the Construction and Housing Association of Social Insurance Institutions in 1934, states that a total of 490 apartments were built at that time.) two longest (about 200 meters), four-story blocks with an internal open courtyard at 24 and 26 Bednarska Street in the "officials' quarter", and five in the "workers' quarter" (assigned to Adolf Dygasiński Street – numbers 6 and 10, and Nowo Pabianicka Street, now Sanocka – numbers 20, 22, and 24). The apartments in the blocks at 24 and 26 Bednarska Street were generally larger and more comfortable than those in the "workers' quarter" blocks. 36 of them had three rooms, a kitchen, a bathroom, and a pantry (or a so-called servants' room) with a total usable area of 85 m^{2}. They were equipped with masonry heaters, gas installations with Siemens storage water heaters, toilets, parquet floors, and doors and windows with brass fittings. For the first time in Łódź, combined (Swedish-type) windows and panel doors were installed in all blocks. Each part of the estate was enclosed with steel mesh fencing, which gradually became overgrown with grapevine. Gates in the fence were locked at night by a caretaker. Until the 1950s, the estate had its own water supply from a deep well located in the Legionów Park.

According to the project, new streets (Unicka and Stefan Żółkiewski) were laid out in 1930. Later, between 1933 and 1934, according to the project by Łódź landscape architect Stefan Rogowicz, a nearly three-hectare park (much larger than originally planned) was created between Bednarska and Sanocka streets, separating the blocks in the "workers' quarter" from Stefan Żółkiewski Street.

The newly constructed residential blocks represent International Style within the modernist style, thus being compared to the works of the German Bauhaus and French Le Corbusier. The project's role in the city's spatial structure was defined as a self-contained crystallizing element, and its significance in the urban landscape as a spatial system dominant in architectural and urbanistic terms. Initially named Z.U.P.U. (Social Insurance Institution for Intellectual Workers), residents often referred to it as living in the soup (Polish: w zupie) or on the soup (Polish: na zupie). By 1934, due to the merger of five insurance institutions into a single Social Insurance Institution, the name was changed to Osiedle Z.U.S. (now Osiedle ZUS). The new park was immediately named the Z.U.S. Park.

In 1937, due to the nationwide economic crisis, bankruptcy proceedings were initiated against the company Leonhardt – Woelker – Girbardt. The following year, the bankrupt woolen goods factory, including the estate with the park and all the villas located within it, was purchased by the heirs of Markus Kohn, a Jewish manufacturer from Łódź who had died in 1921 and owned the Markus Kohn Wool Spinning Factory at 5/7 Łąkowa Street (now numbered 3/5).

As of 1 July 1938, all properties on Bednarska Street were included in an area of the city where keeping animals – swine, cattle, sheep, and goats – was prohibited by the decree of the Łódź City Starosta.

In April 1939, the Schweikert villa at number 42 was acquired by Józef and Kazimiera Usielski, who established a fruit wine factory in the adjacent utility building. (Note: Józef Usielski was the owner of the Łódź-based Meadery and Wine Factory Brawinus. After World War II, in March 1947, Kazimiera Usielska (together with partners Bogdan Usielski and Józef Usielski) registered a wine and mead production company under the name Ha-Pe-We, owned by K. Usielska and Sons, a general partnership located at 12 Grzegorz Piramowicz Street.)

After the outbreak of World War II, the German occupiers introduced German-language naming – Bednarska Street was initially renamed Kopernikusstraße (to commemorate the astronomer Nicolaus Copernicus). (Note: He was considered by the Germans at that time to be a scholar of German nationality.) The first expulsions from Bednarska Street occurred on 13 December 1939. On that day, Dr. Feliks Iwicki, a former member of the Polish Military Organization, along with his wife and son, was expelled from their apartment within half an hour and transported to the Radogoszcz camp, and in February 1940, during the harsh winter, to Staszów. In February 1940, within a few hours, the Germans carried out mass expulsions of residents from the entire Osiedle ZUS to accommodate the settlers they had designated. The expelled were transported to the central resettlement camp (German: Durchgangslager I der Umwandererzentralstelle Posen, Dienststelle Litzmannstadt), located in the buildings of the former patterned woolen fabric factory of Baruch A. Gliksman at 4 Wiesenstraße (later Flottwellstraße, now Łąkowa Street), and from there to Końskie. The vacated apartments, sealed with paper strips, initially remained empty because the Germans intended to bring settlers from Estonia and Courland. Ultimately, they were mainly allocated to the families of Wehrmacht soldiers and officers. Additionally, a Ordnungspolizei post was established in the building at 24 Bednarska Street. The Schweikert villa was vacated in 1939, and the Usielski family was removed. The Girbardt villa at number 15a (Note: Numer 15, indicating Wilhelm Völker's villa, is cited in numerous sources. The address 15 Ostpreußenstraße is also mentioned by Werner Vetzki's son, Jens-Jürgen.) was occupied by the lord mayor of Łódź, Werner Ventzki, from autumn 1941 until July 23, 1943, with his family residing there until September 1944.

After 11 April 1940, when Łódź, incorporated into the Reichsgau Wartheland (under the German name Lodsch) became Litzmannstadt, the German occupying authorities changed the street's name to Ostpreußenstraße (German for East Prussia).

=== 1945–1989 ===
After the war, the street's pre-war, original name was restored.

During the Polish People's Republic, former factory owner villas became headquarters for newly established educational and childcare institutions. Wilhelm Völker's villa (at number 15) was turned into Children's Home No. 6, while Hilmar Girbardt's villa (at number 15a) was occupied by an on-site nursery and kindergarten, belonging to the Łódź Wool Industry Plant No. 13 at 4 Independence Square (after nationalization – successor to the Stock Company of the Leonhardt – Woelker – Girbardt Cloth Manufactory, until 1952 a branch of the State Wool Industry Plant No. 6 at 3/5 Łąkowa Street, from 1970 – the Arelan Worsted Spinning Mill). In the Schweikert family residence (at number 42), the State Four-Year Librarianship High School was opened, which operated there until the late 1950s and early 1960s.

In 1952, the grounds of the former factory owner's park were tidied up and made publicly accessible, and the park was named after the Łódź-born communist activist Władysław Hibner. (Note: In maps of Łódź published after 1952 until the early 1990s, the ZUS park was omitted from the list of parks – only Władysław Hibner Park was mentioned. On the maps themselves, only the latter name appeared, and until the 1970s, ZUS park was not recognized as a park area at all. This suggests that ZUS park was absorbed by Władysław Hibner Park, although it is difficult to determine the exact time of this event or whether the incorporation was formalized through a legal act. This situation is confirmed by the content of the Łódź City Council resolution (no. LXXVI/719/94 from 27 May 1994), which gave the name Legionów Park to the previously unnamed park located on the eastern side of Pabianicka Street between Sanocka Street and Independence Square (the former Władysław Hibner Park).)

In the summer of 1954, a group of children and youth from Greece, evacuated to Poland in the spring of 1949 due to the ongoing civil war in their homeland, arrived at Children's Home No. 6 at number 15. Among them was Stathis Jeropoulos, who later, after graduating from the State High School of Fine Arts in Łódź, worked at the Small Film Forms Studio Se-ma-for.

In the late 1950s and early 1960s, the former Schweikert residence was taken over by the newly created branch of the state-run Small Film Forms Studio Se-ma-for (since 1990 the Semafor Film Studio). In the 1960s, the tennis courts, probably established before World War I and located in the southern part of what was then Władysław Hibner Park, along Bednarska Street, were dismantled. A playground was created in their place.

In 1973, despite protests from residents, the wire fence around Osiedle ZUS blocks was dismantled on the orders of Bednarczyk, chairman of the District National Council for Łódź-Górna. According to Adam Antczak and Jarosław Warzecha, the tenants' delegation was told that sanation-era blocks will not be fenced off. Anna Stall recalled the event similarly. On the other hand, Sławomir Arabski reflected that removing the fence was a great injustice to the estates. According to Antczak and Warzecha, the removal of the fence around the blocks, inhabited by families considered to be well-off, facilitated Andrzej Pietrzak and his accomplice in carrying out a robbery on 20 September 1976 in an apartment of a doctor couple at 24 Bednarska Street, during which he murdered two women. (Note: For this crime, as well as the murder of a woman on Czahary Street, Andrzej Pietrzak was sentenced to death by the Provincial Court in Łódź. The sentence was carried out on 6 February 1978.)

In 1975, the Łódź Ogniwo Housing Cooperative completed the construction of the tallest building on Bednarska Street – an 11-story large-panel residential block at number 9.

=== Since 1989 ===
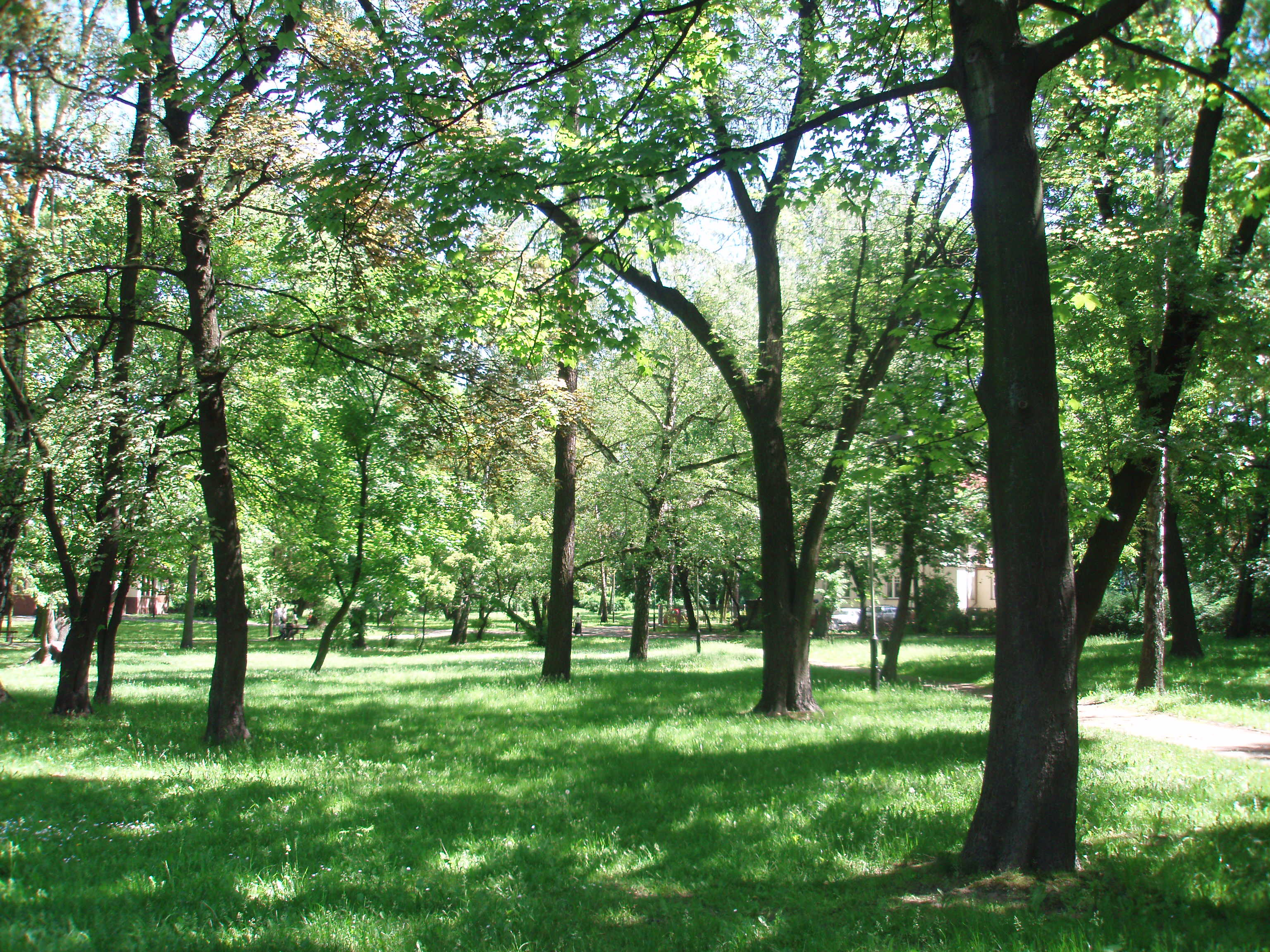
Legionów Park – view from Bednarska Street (June 2008)

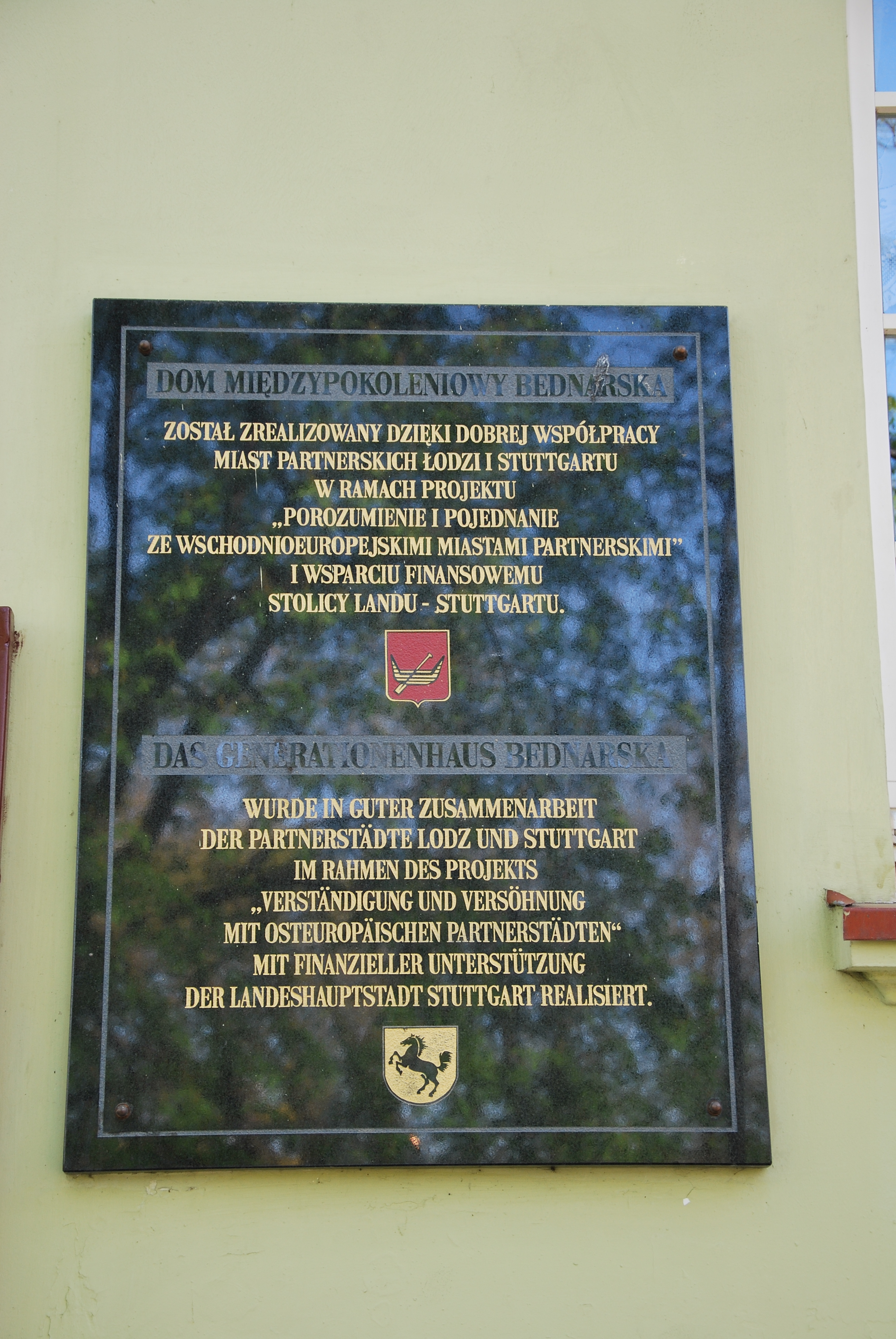
Memorial plaque on the wall of the former Hilmar Girbardt villa, now the headquarters of Children's Home No. 9 – Intergenerational Home Bednarska (April 2012)

On 31 January 1991, by resolution of the Łódź City Council, the name of Władysław Hibner Park was annulled – for over three years it remained nameless until 27 May 1994 when the City Council named it Legionów Park.

During the Third Polish Republic, the on-site kindergarten and nursery in the former Girbardt villa at number 15a were closed. At the turn of the 20th and 21st centuries, the building underwent renovation and restoration work. On 1 September 2004, Children's Home No. 9, relocated from 40a Jan Dąbrowski Street, opened under the new name: Children's Home No. 9 – Intergenerational Home Bednarska. The facility was established as part of the project Agreement and Reconciliation with Partner Cities in Central and Eastern Europe, carried out jointly by the authorities of Łódź and Stuttgart, based on a declaration of intent signed on 25 November 2003. It includes Children's Home No. 9, a Day Care Home (for seniors), and the Home of Memory and Future run by the Łódź branch of the Association of Poles Victimized by the Third Reich.

After the closure of the Semafor Film Studio at the end of 1999, the former Schweikert residence was purchased by a private investor. After renovating it, the investor leased the property to the Łódź branch of Kredyt Bank, which was absorbed by Bank Zachodni WBK on 4 January 2013. The bank continued leasing the villa, and after rebranding on 8 September 2018, it operated as Santander Bank Polska.

In September 2007, Jens-Jürgen Ventzki, along with his daughter Saskia, visited his birthplace – the former Girbardt villa at 15a. (Note: Numer 15, indicating Wilhelm Völker's villa, is cited in numerous sources. The address 15 Ostpreußenstraße is also mentioned by Werner Vetzki's son, Jens-Jürgen.) He learned about his father Werner Ventzki's past as the mayor of Litzmannstadt only in 1990, at the age of 46.

At the turn of the first and second decades of the 21st century, new urban plans were drawn up for the area surrounding Independence Square, including Bednarska Street. According to the concept of creating inner-city bypasses for Łódź, contained in the April 2009 study by the Urban and Estate Development Enterprise Teren Ltd., titled Study of Conditions and Directions of Spatial Development for the City of Łódź, Bednarska Street was to become a collector road, part of the city's first inner bypass.

Between 2011 and 2013, a project for the spatial development plan was prepared for the area bounded by Stanisław Przybyszewski–Krucza–Zarzewska–Łomżyńska–Jarosław Dąbrowski–Rzgowska–Bednarska–Wólczańska–Sieradzka–Piotrkowska streets, and Władysław Reymont Square. The plan proposed significant widening of Bednarska Street, either by adding a second two-lane roadway or expanding the existing two-lane road to four lanes. After numerous protests from residents, the plan was revised, keeping a single two-lane road. The plan also included incorporating the oldest allotments in Łódź at 19/21 Bednarska Street into Legionów Park, reconstructing the Bednarska and Wólczańska intersection with Pabianicka Street into a roundabout, building bike paths and new sidewalks along the street, implementing solutions to reduce noise levels and improve pedestrian safety at crossings, and planting rows of trees. The plan was approved by the Łódź City Council on 4 June 2014 and took effect on August 3 of the same year.

Regarding road safety between 2011 and 2013, Bednarska Street ranked 102nd among 362 streets in Łódź where accidents occurred (the ranking is descending – from streets with the highest number of incidents). During this period, 10 accidents took place on the street, resulting in 10 injuries, 6 of which were serious.

On 29 March 2016, by resolution of the Łódź City Council, Bednarska Street was included in the area designated as degraded and subject to revitalization in the city of Łódź. A year later, on March 30, the street was incorporated into the Special Revitalization Zone by resolution of the Łódź councilors.

On 2 April 2017, for the first time in its history, public transport began operating on Bednarska Street – buses on route 72, running from Independence Square to the Janów housing estate and back.

On 2 July 2019, a section of Bednarska Street was part of the honorary start (on Piotrkowska Street near Leon Schiller Passage) to the actual start (on Kolumny Street near property no. 260) of the first stage (from Łódź to Sieradz) of the 30th Course de Solidarność et des Champions Olympiques.

=== Former company locations ===
- No. 10 – Mechanical Hosiery Factory L. Krauze and R. J. Güttler – existed from at least 1909; from 1911 to 1914, it was known as the Hosiery Factory L. Krauze; Ernst Hegenbart's mechanical weaving mill – existed from 1922 and is listed in the 1926 Business Directory.
- No. 24 – Scandria Ltd., a technical articles company – 1930s.

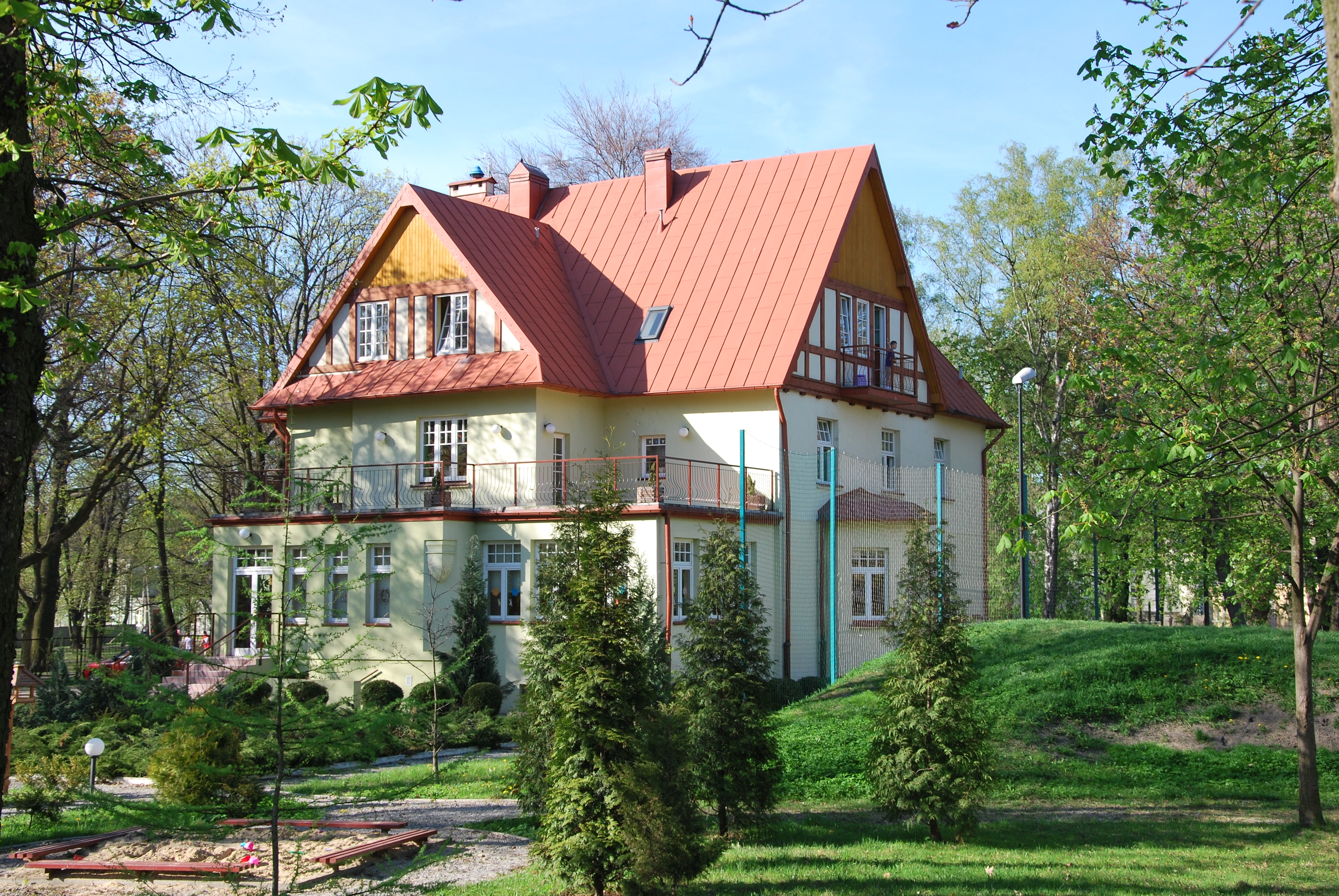
Former Hilmar Girbardt villa at No. 15a, from 1 September 2004, home to the Children's Home No. 9 – Bednarska Intergenerational House (April 2012)

=== Famous residents ===
- The Schweikert Family, Łódź manufacturers of German origin – formerly 42 Bednarska Street (Böttcherstraße between 1916 and 1918), from around 1900 to around 1939.
- Wilhelm Völker, German manufacturer, brother-in-law of Ernst Leonhardt – 15 Bednarska Street, before World War II from the turn of the first and second decade of the 20th century.
- Hilmar Girbardt, German manufacturer, partner of Ernst Leonhardt and Wilhelm Völker – 15a Bednarska Street, before World War II from the turn of the first and second decade of the 20th century.
- Ludwik Hauk, industrial section advisor for the Łódź Chamber of Commerce – 42 Bednarska Street, interwar period.
- Józef Janicki, deputy director of the Municipal Savings Bank of Łódź – 24 Bednarska Street, interwar period.
- Feliks Iwicki, doctor, former member of the Polish Military Organization, co-founder of Skra Warsaw – 24 Bednarska Street, (Note: In the pre-war address book, it is listed at 1 Unicka Street.) 1930s to 13 December 1939.
- Leszek Kołakowski, philosopher – 24 or 26 Bednarska Street, 1930s to the outbreak of World War II (lived as a child with his aunt, a Łódź insurance doctor) and from 1945 to 1949.
- Alfred Wiłkomirski, violinist, conductor, and pedagogue (with his family, including daughter Wanda) – 26 Bednarska Street, early 1930s.
- Władysław Kocuper, State Police commissioner, from 8 April 1935 police chief for the Łódź district – 24 Bednarska Street, from April 1935.
- Henryk Józewski, Łódź Voivode – 15 Bednarska Street, 1938–1939.
- Werner Ventzki, lord mayor of Łódź – 15a Ostpreußenstraße, (Note: Numer 15, indicating Wilhelm Völker's villa, is cited in numerous sources. The address 15 Ostpreußenstraße is also mentioned by Werner Vetzki's son, Jens-Jürgen.) from 15 November 1941 to 23 July 1943 (his wife and four children, including son Jens-Jürgen born there on 13 March 1944 – until September 1944).
- Hanna Ożogowska, writer and translator of Russian, German, and Italian literature, in the first years after World War II, director of the Pedagogical High School for Kindergarten Teachers in Łódź – 26 Bednarska Street, post-war period until 1951.
- Zygmunt Zahorski, mathematician, professor, lecturer at the University of Łódź and Silesian University of Technology in Gliwice – 24 or 26 Bednarska Street, 1948–1970.
- Zygmunt Charzyński, mathematician, professor, lecturer at Łódź University of Technology and University of Łódź – 24 or 26 Bednarska Street, post-war period.
- Karol Głogowski, lawyer, opposition activist during the Polish People's Republic – 24 Bednarska Street, post-war period.
- Wojciech Marczewski, director – 26 Bednarska Street, post-war period.
- Władysława Matuszewska, commander of the Łódź Polish Scouting and Guiding Association – 24 or 26 Bednarska Street, post-war period.
- Tadeusz Szczerbic, lawyer and writer, member of the World Association of Home Army Soldiers (with family, including daughter Joanna and son Michał) – 24 Bednarska Street, from the 1950s.
- Magdalena Tesławska, costume designer, with family (father Konstanty – longtime director of Miastoprojekt – Łódź, brother Marek – architect) – 26 Bednarska Street, post-war period, parents – from the 1930s.
- Jarosław Warzecha, journalist, playwright, and prose writer – 24 or 26 Bednarska Street, post-war period.
- Mieczysław Woźniakowski, curator of the Łódź School District, councilor of the Łódź National Council – 24 or 26 Bednarska Street, post-war period.

=== Chronology of street name changes ===
Period of use	Street name
circa 1910–1916	Bednarska Street (Беднарска улица)
1916–1918	Böttcherstraße
1918–1939	Bednarska Street
1940	Kopernikusstraße
1940–1945	Ostpreußenstraße
since 1945	Bednarska Street

== Bednarska Street in culture ==
In 1959, Hanna Ożogowska (a resident of the building at 26 Bednarska Street in the early post-war period, until 1951) published a youth novel titled Tajemnica zielonej pieczęci through the State Publishing House for Children's Literature Nasza Księgarnia. The protagonists – sixth-graders named Bartek, Stefan, and Wiktor – lived in the ZUS housing estate in Łódź, where the novel's action took place. Bednarska Street appeared multiple times in the novel, and one of the characters was based on the caretaker of the building at number 24, named Chybała.

In 2013, Tadeusz Morawski – a professor of electronics and author of palindromes – published a column titled Listy palindromisty: Mało wiz do Łodzi – wołam! Palindromy w Łodzi, in which he shared Professor Michał Tadeusiewicz's story about life in the blocks at 24 and 26 Bednarska Street and their close vicinity in the post-war years.

In 2018, the street was used as a filming location (standing in for Warsaw's Ochota district) during the production of the movie under the working title Dom Tułaczy – the directorial debut of Mariko Bobrik (a graduate of the Łódź Film School). The premiere was scheduled for 2019. The film was eventually titled Smak pho and premiered on 3 July 2020.

== Buildings ==
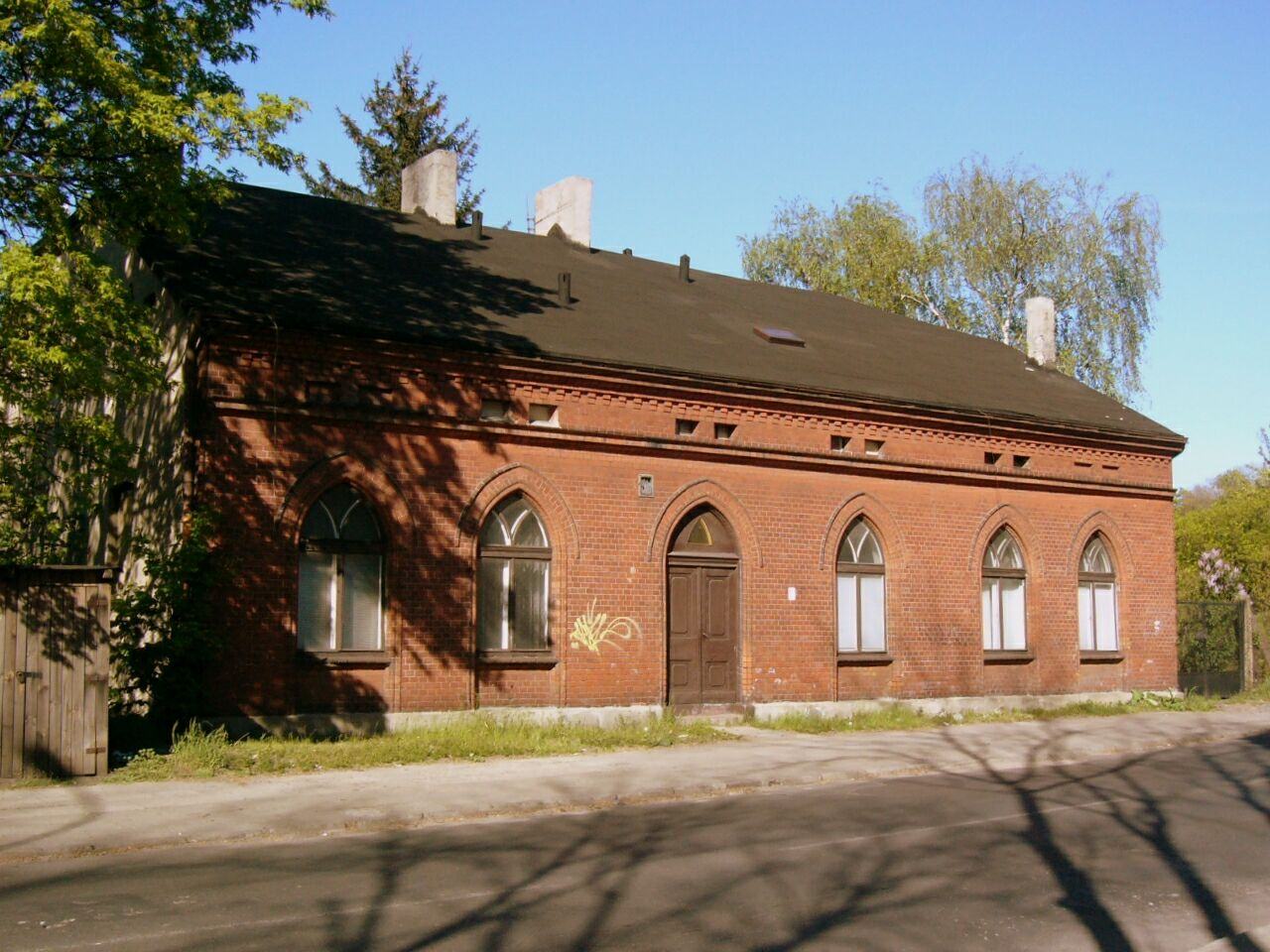
No. 23a – house of Jan Stencel, later owned by the Steigert brothers

- No. 9 – an 11-story residential block from 1975, part of the Ogniwo Housing Cooperative – the tallest building on the street.
- No. 15 – a post-Art Nouveau villa built between 1907 and 1909 for the German industrialist Ernst Leonhardt, former headquarters of the Leonhardt – Woelker – Girbardt Cloth Manufacturing Company. It now houses the Stanisław Jachowicz Children's Home No. 6.
- No. 15a – another post-Art Nouveau villa from 1907 for Ernst Leonhardt, since 1 September 2004, it has housed Children's Home No. 9 – the Bednarska Intergenerational Home.
- No. 19/21 – the Stefan Błaszczyk Family Allotment, part of the original factory allotments established in 1906 with financial support from Ernst Leonhardt – the oldest surviving allotments in Łódź.
- No. 23a – a residential house from the late 19th/early 20th century belonging to Jan Stencel, later owned by the Steigert brothers.
- No. 24 – a 4-story residential block in the ZUS housing estate. During World War II, it housed a Ordnungspolizei post.
- No. 26 – another 4-story residential block from Osiedle ZUS.
- No. 42 – a villa from around 1896, formerly the residence of the Schweikert family from around 1900 to 1939.

As of August 2016, six buildings on Bednarska Street were listed in the municipal heritage register of Łódź: three villas (at Nos. 15, 15a, and 42), one residential house (No. 23a), and two blocks from Osiedle ZUS (Nos. 24 and 26). Earlier (in 2010), two other buildings were listed: a house from the late 19th century (No. 4, demolished after 2010) and another house from the turn of the 19th/20th century (No. 17).

== Street numbering and postal codes ==
- Even numbers: 2–42
- Odd numbers: 3–23a
- Postal codes: 93-009 (1–9 odd and 2–22 even), 93-030 (11–21 odd and 24–36 even), 93-037 (23–23a odd and 38–42 even)

== Transport ==
=== Current state ===
The street is served by Municipal Transport Company in Łódź city buses (regular routes as of September 2024, not including any temporary route changes or replacement lines):

- Day lines:
  - 72A – since 1 October 2021 – from Janów Estate towards Huta Jagodnica and back.
  - 72B – since 1 October 2021 – from Janów Estate towards Huta Jagodnica and back.

There are two bus stops along the street: one after the intersection with Unicka Street (stop no. 2228, towards Independence Square) and another near house no. 42 (stop no. 2295, towards Janów Estate).

=== In the past ===
Previously, the following buses ran along Bednarska Street:

- Day line:
  - 72 – from 2 April 2017 to 21 December 2018 – from Independence Square towards Janów Estate and back.
  - 72A – from December 22, 2018, to September 30, 2021 – from Independence Square towards Janów Estate and back.
  - 72B – from December 22, 2018, to September 30, 2021 – from Independence Square towards Janów Estate and back.

Before 2 April 2017, no regular public transport routes passed through Bednarska Street.

== Bibliography ==
- Antczak, Adam; Warzecha, Jarosław (1994). "Banknot H 02598335 A" [Banknote H 02598335 A]. Pitawal Łódzki 1954 – 1986 [Łódź Crime Chronicle 1954 – 1986] (in Polish) (I ed.). Łódź: MAGART S.c. ISBN 83-85980-06-7.
- Bonisławski, Ryszard; Kusiński, Jacek (2009). "Rzgowska 17" [17 Rzgowska Street]. Księga fabryk Łodzi [The Book of Factories in Łódź] (in Polish). Łódź: Jacek Kusiński. ISBN 978-83-927666-74.
- Olenderek, Joanna (2012). "Kolonie mieszkalne. Kolonia urzędniczo-robotnicza ZUS" [Residential Colonies. ZUS Clerical and Workers' Colony]. Łódzki modernizm i inne nurty przedwojennego budownictwa [Łódź Modernism and Other Trends in Pre-War Architecture] (in Polish). Vol. II (I ed.). Łódź: Księży Młyn. ISBN 978-83-7729-088-0.
