= Józef Poniatowski Park in Łódź =

Park in Old Polesie in Łódź, Poland

Prince Józef Poniatowski Park
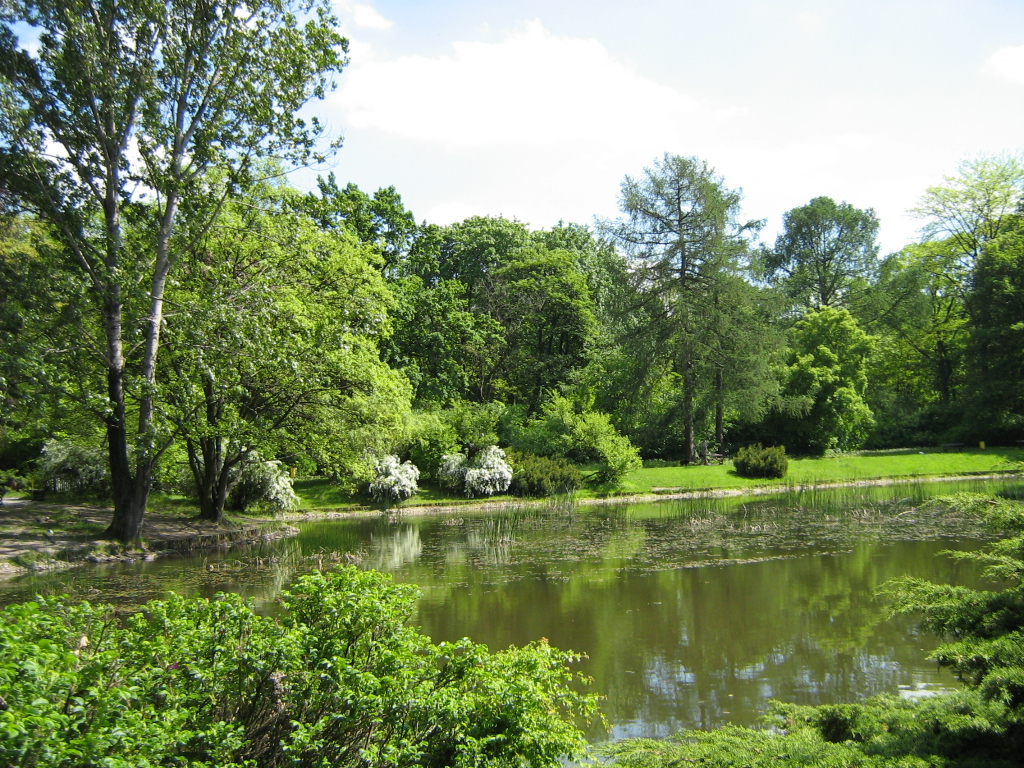
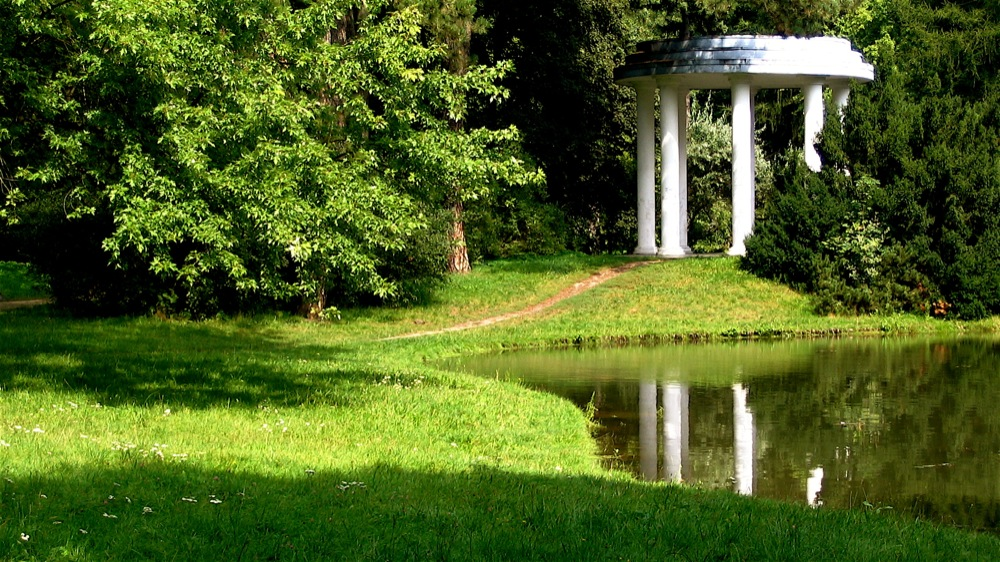
- Interactive map of Prince Józef Poniatowski Park
- Type: Municipal
- Location: Łódź
- Coordinates: 51°45′13.93″N 19°26′34.38″E
- Area: 41.6 ha
- Status: Open all year

The Prince Józef Poniatowski Park in Łódź (Polish: Park im. księcia Józefa Poniatowskiego w Łodzi) is a park in Łódź, Poland located between Żeromskiego, Mickiewicza, Jana Pawła II and Parkowa Streets. The area of the park is 41.6 ha (103 acres). It was named in honour of Polish general and statesman Prince Józef Poniatowski (1763–1813).

== History ==
It was created in 1910 on the initiative of the city authorities, in the areas of the former city forests, reaching much further north than the current park (they included, among others, the areas of the current hospital, church, and film studio). The old name was "Garden on Pańska Street". From 1917 the park was named after Prince Poniatowski.

The area of the park has decreased over the years. First, a military hospital was established on the corner of Anna (now Mickiewicza) and Pańska (ul. Żeromskiego), and in 1925 the construction of the Church of Our Lady of Victory began at the intersection of Łąkowa and Anna streets. In the 1970s, the park was trimmed with a wide strip of present Mickiewicza Avenue and currently has a shape similar to a rectangle. The southern border is marked out by Parkowa and Radwańska streets. From the west, Jana Pawła II Avenue, and from the east Żeromskiego Street. The latter is also where the most representative entrance to the park is located. There are two war cemeteries in the park.

The park has an original spatial plan, symmetrical and regular, with alleys, corners, and lawns. The plan of the park combined elements of a natural English park and a French park shaped by the gardener's hand. The interior on the east-west axis remains an open space with low greenery. The remaining one is overgrown by the stand, which is partly a remnant of the city forests. To fulfill the designer's idea, one and a half thousand coniferous trees were cut down in a few years and nearly 100,000 trees and shrubs planted in their place.

Garden at Pańska (former name of Żeromskiego Street) was unlucky from the beginning, in 1910 the plague of wild rabbits caused great damage, then the park was fenced. During World War I it was open to the public. At the time, because of hunger, potatoes were grown instead of flowers. In subsequent years, playgrounds were built, and children's leisure activities were organized, including slide and sledging, a pond was dug and a hill was dug out of the excavated soil. At the end of the 1920s, a residential villa was built for the city president, in the following years a bridge and gazebo by the pond, as well as a Jordanian garden.

In 1938, a monument to Stanisław Moniuszko was erected on the main axis of the park, unfortunately, destroyed by the Germans a year later. During World War II, the Germans closed the park for Poles and Jews, and most of the conifers that remained from the city forests were cut down, the perennial garden was also liquidated, and tennis courts were built in its place (currently the Municipal Tennis Club). During the war, the bottom of the pond was also destroyed, which was not rebuilt until 1957.

A reminder of the war are two cemeteries of Soviet soldiers killed in January 1945. On 18th of November 1945 the new communist authorities erected monument of gratitude to the Red Army on the site of an earlier monument of Moniuszko. The monument was eventually demolished in 1993 after several coffins which were underneath had been transferred in November 1992 to a small military cemetery in the park.

== Gallery ==
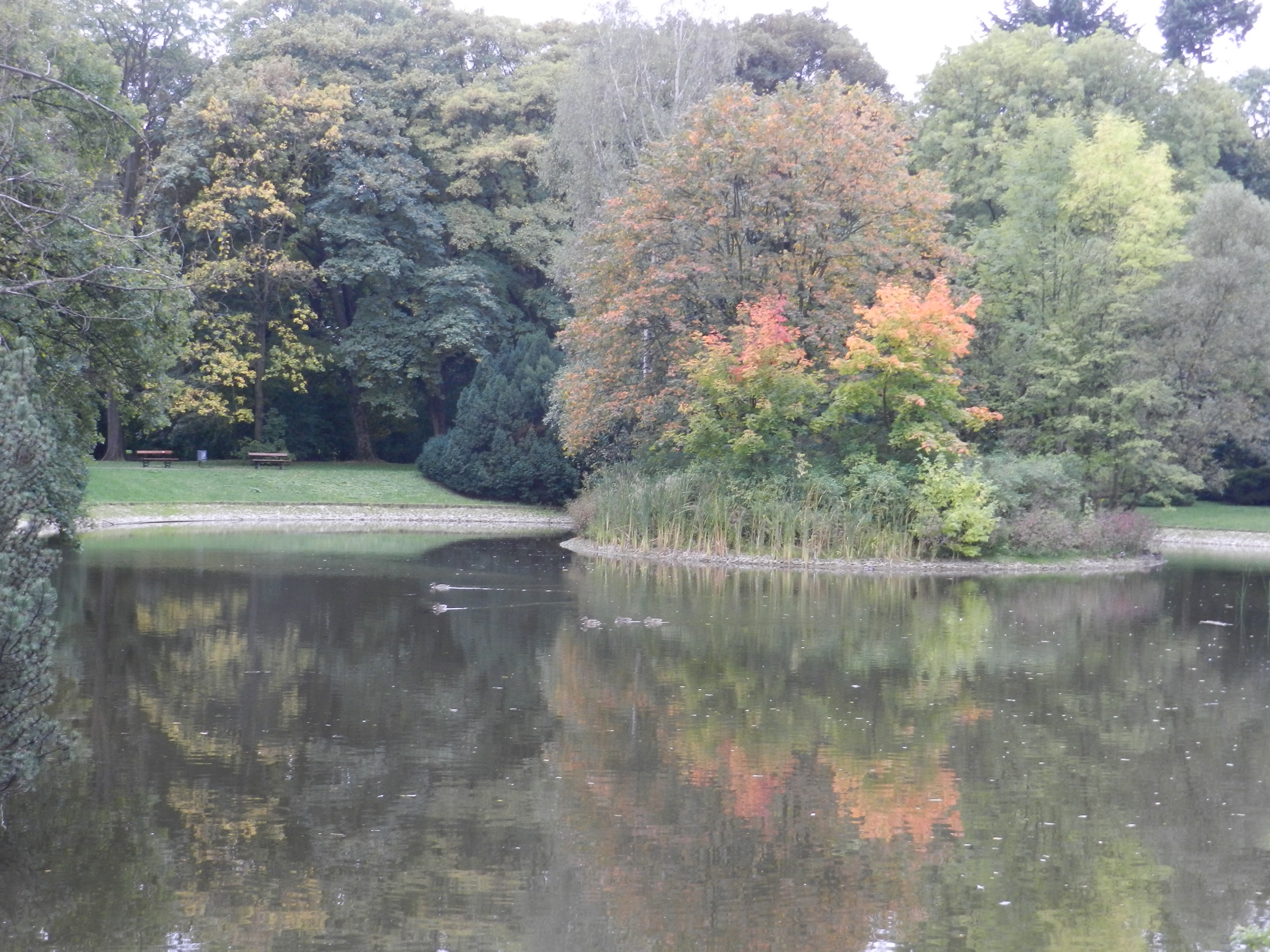
The pond

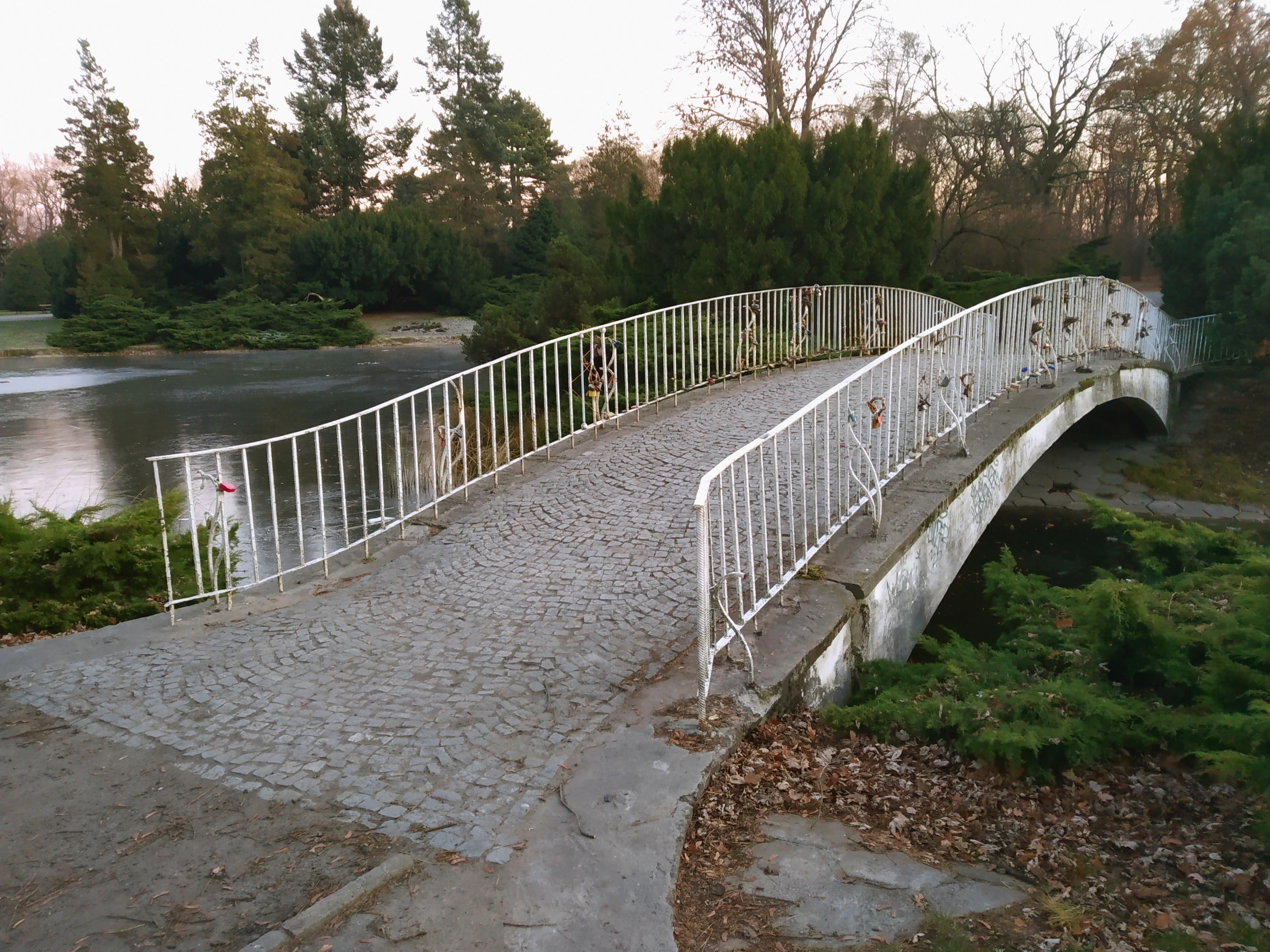
Bridge with love padlocks

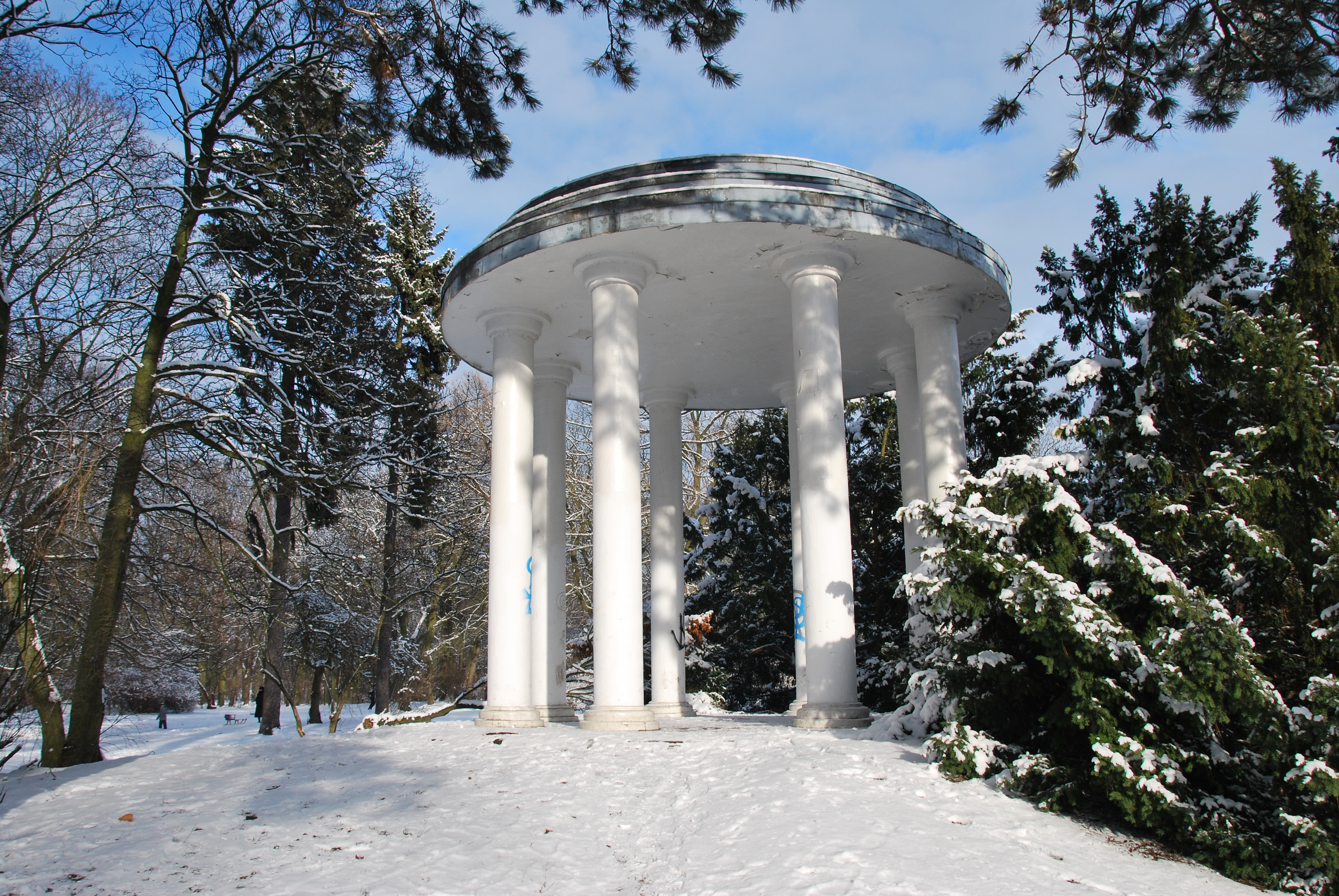
Park in winter

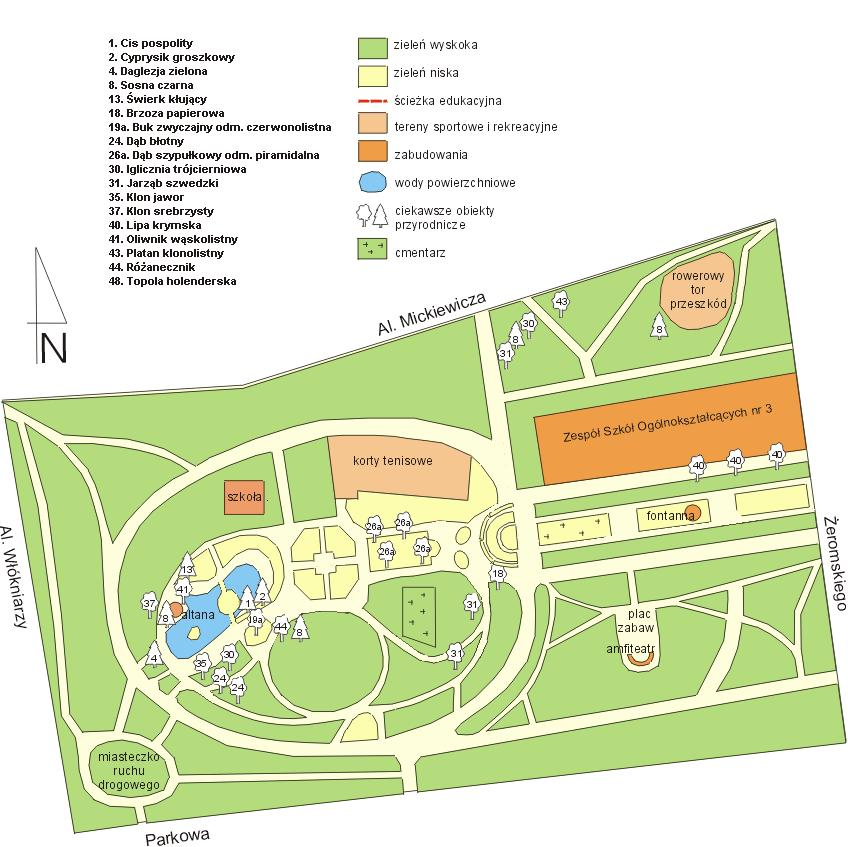
Map of the park

== See also ==
- Łazienki Park
