= Łąkowa Street =

Street in Łódź, Poland

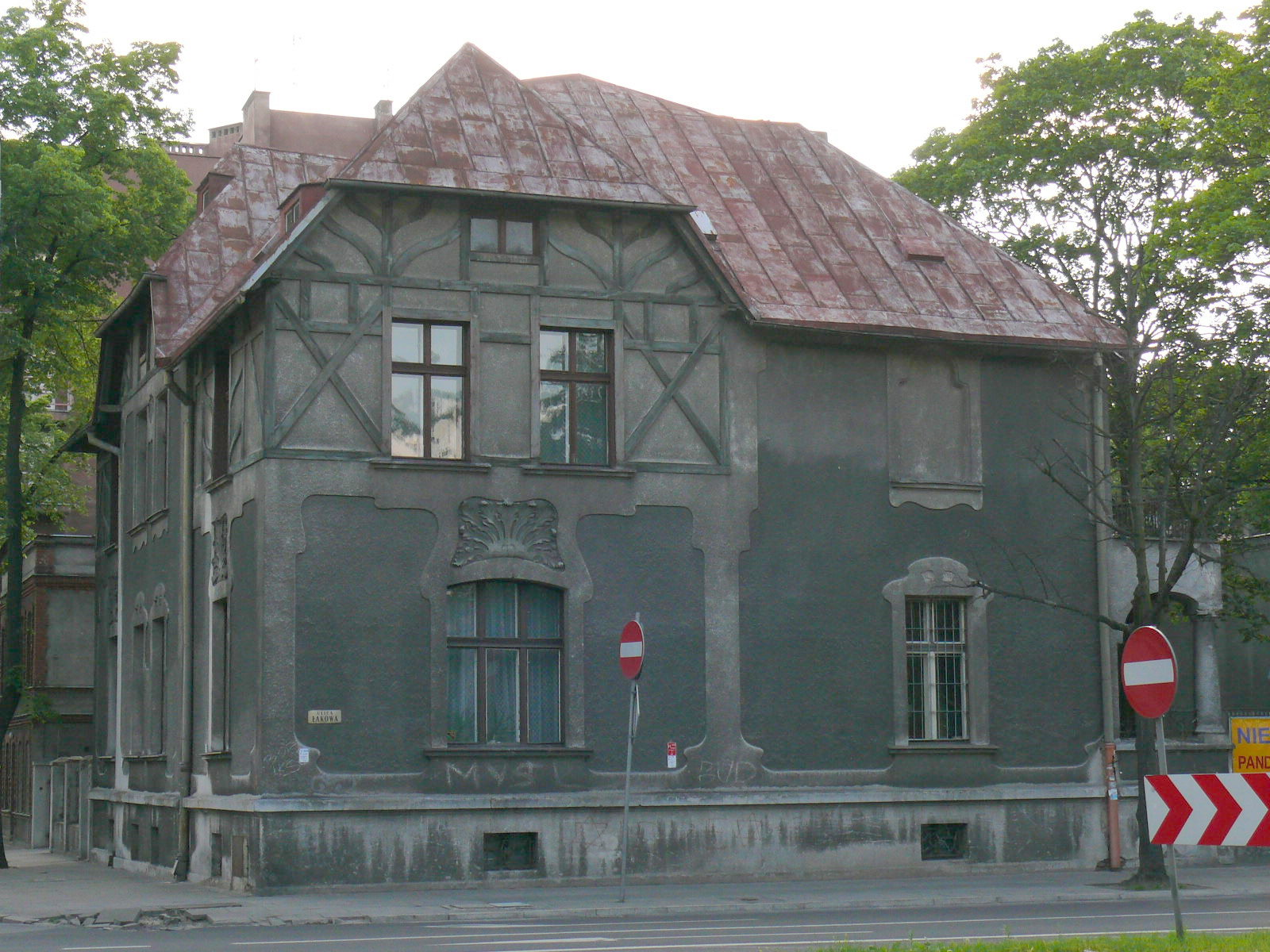
- Schimmel Villa (corner of Łąkowa and Karolewska streets)

- Location within Poland
- Former names: Wiesenstrasse (1915–1918, 1940), Flottwellstraße (1940–1945)
- Part of: Stare Polesie
- Location: Łódź
- Coordinates: 51°45′38.77″N 19°26′31.33″E

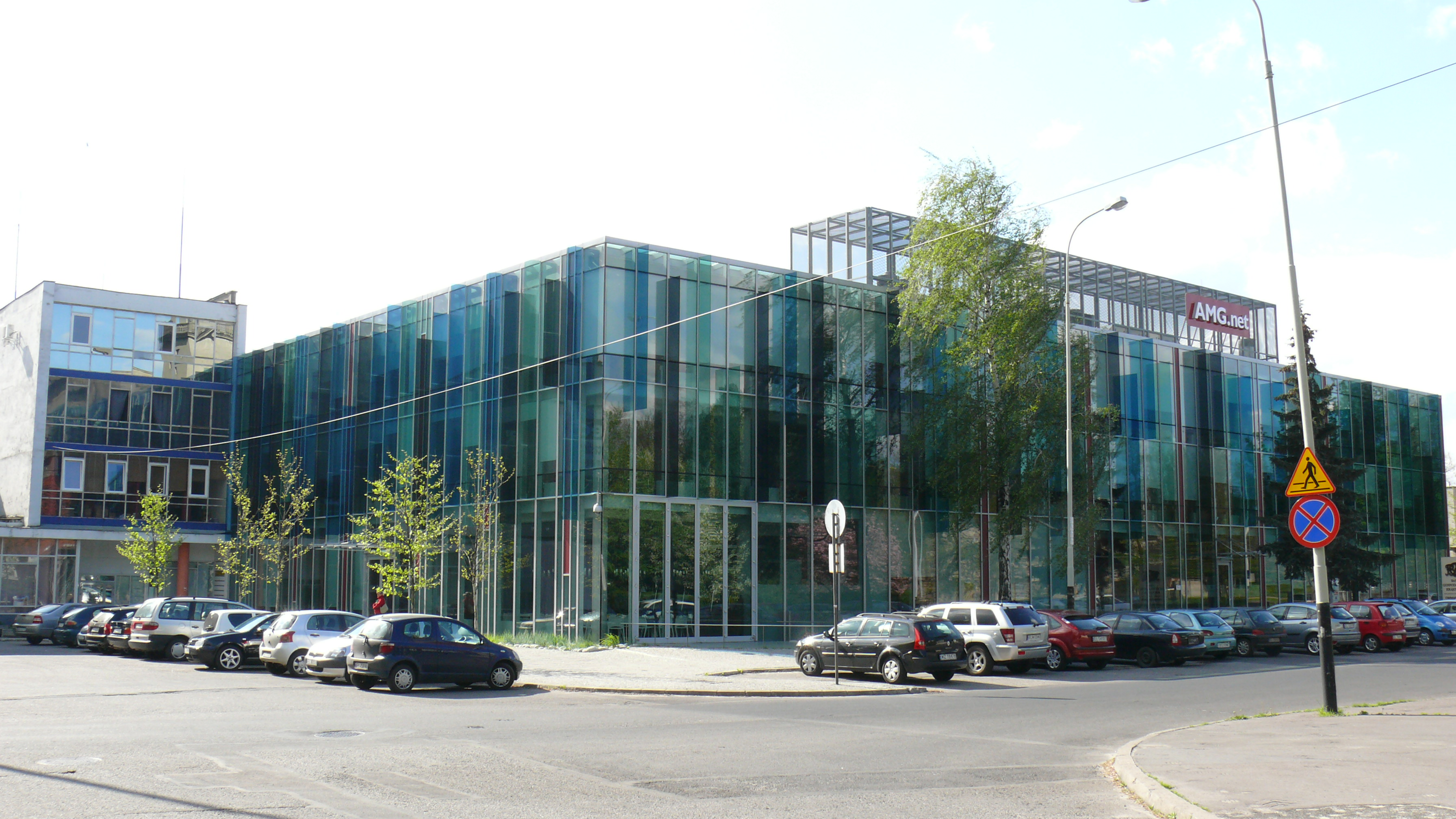
Headquarters of Opus Film

Łąkowa Street is a street in Łódź, Poland, running north-south from Andrzej Strug Street to Adam Mickiewicz Avenue. It is located in the Stare Polesie district. Łąkowa Street is the southern extension of Lucjan Żeligowski Street.

== History ==
Łąkowa Street was established around 1842. During the German occupation from 1915 to 1918, it was named Wiesenstrasse. In 1940, during the German occupation of World War II, the name was reintroduced as Wiesenstrasse and later changed to Flottwellstraße.

In 1882, Teodor Milsch built a villa at the corner of Łąkowa and Milsch streets (now Mikołaj Kopernik Street), adjacent to his brewery and an "entertainment garden". In the mid-1890s, Franciszek Kindermann constructed a wool spinning factory at the intersection of St. Andrew (now 61/63 Andrzej Strug Street) and Łąkowa streets, which was later used by the Optima confectionery and partially by the Łódź Printing House after World War II. Kindermann had lived and operated weaving workshops at Przejazd Street (now Julian Tuwim Street) since 1859 before relocating to Strug Street in 1868. In 1897, Juliusz Kindermann built a cotton textile factory at 23 Łąkowa Street, including a weaving mill, dyehouse, finishing plant, and power station. In 1899, a Secession-style villa designed by Franciszek Chełmiński was constructed at the corner of Łąkowa and Karolewska streets, and in 1903, Robert Nestler, a construction entrepreneur, built a villa for himself at 13 Łąkowa Street. In 1905, Karol Bennich established a factory at 11 Łąkowa Street, relocating production from 105 Piotrkowska Street (Karol Bennich Wool Manufactory Joint-Stock Company), which was converted into offices in 1993. In 1938, the Our Lady of Victory Church-Sanctuary was built at the street's end, near Józef Poniatowski Park.

Between 1939 and 1940, the Germans established a central resettlement camp at 4 Łąkowa Street (formerly Baruch Gliksman's patterned wool fabric factory) for Poles deported to the General Government or sent for forced labour in Germany and France. The camp was used for racial selection, with some prisoners transferred to other camps or the SS Race and Settlement Main Office at the Church of St. Elizabeth of Hungary after the monks were expelled. The camp operated until the end of the war. A memorial plaque on a boulder near the sidewalk at 4 Łąkowa Street commemorates this site.

In 1945, a sports hall at 29 Łąkowa Street became the Łódź Feature Film Studio, with additional filming facilities built in 1950. This studio marked the beginning of postwar Polish cinematography.

In 1990, the Katyn Memorial was unveiled on a square near the church.

== Notable buildings and sites ==
- Teodor Tietzen Villa (No. 1, corner with Strug Street)
- Vocational Training Centre (No. 4)
- Robert Nestler Villa (No. 13), now a municipal kindergarten
- Ryszard Schimmel Villa (corner with Karolewska Street), headquarters of the Metal, Optical, and Electrical Crafts Guild, listed in the Register of Monuments
- Teodor Milsch Villa (No. 21, corner with Kopernik Street), listed in the Register of Monuments
- Hotel Focus (No. 23/25), formerly Juliusz Kindermann's factory, listed in the Register of Monuments
- Film institutions at the former Łódź Feature Film Studio: Toya, Opus Film, branch of the National Film Archive (No. 29)
- Wytwórnia Cinema – 3D (No. 29)
- Wytwórnia Club (No. 29)
- DoubleTree by Hilton Hotel (No. 29)
- Our Lady of Victory Church (No. 40), listed in the Register of Monuments

== Public transport ==
- Buses: Routes 65A (to Łódź Władysław Reymont Airport), 80, 86A, 86B, 99 (to Retkinia)
