= Church of St. Elizabeth of Hungary in Łódź =

Church building in Poland

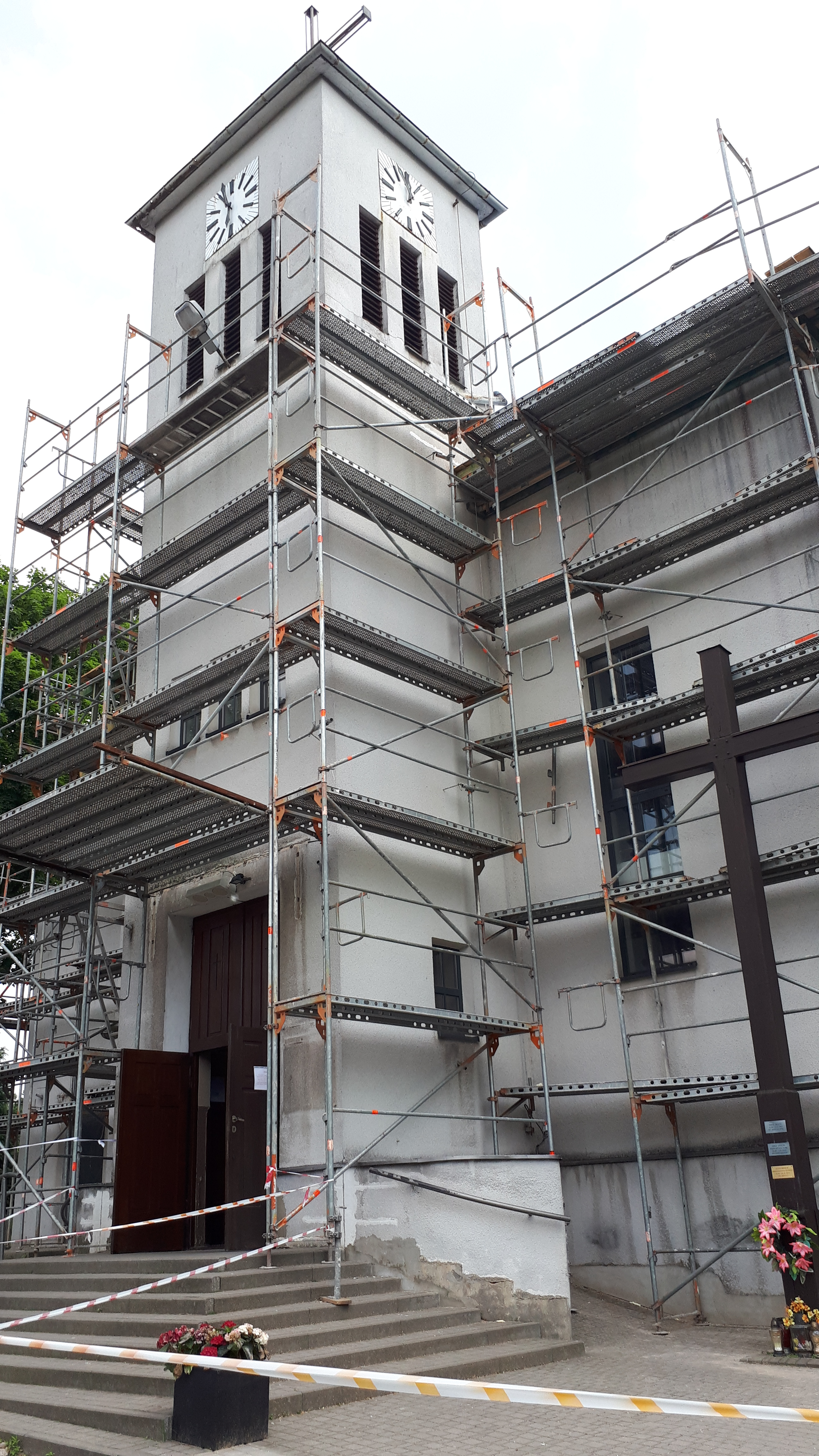
- June 2019

Religion
- Affiliation: Roman Catholic
- Diocese: Archdiocese of Łódź
- Year consecrated: 30 October 1932
- Status: Parish church, sanctuary

Location
- Location: Pankiewicz St. 15, Łódź, Poland
- Interactive map of Church of St. Elizabeth of Hungary in Łódź
- Coordinates: 51°47′15″N 19°28′54″E

Architecture
- Architect: Wiesław Lisowski
- Style: Modernist

Website
- http://www.lodz.bernardyni.pl

Church of St. Elizabeth of Hungary in Łódź (Polish: Kościół św. Elżbiety Węgierskiej) is a Roman Catholic church built in the interwar period in Anastazy Pankiewicz street (formerly: Sporna Street). The several-storey building next to it contains the monastery of Bernards, Bernardine and Catholic High School. The artistic polychrome, made by Zygmunt Acedański in 1960, was painted in white. The main altar of St. Elżbieta Węgierska, Saint Francis of Assisi, Saint Piotr and Our Lady of Fátima. Side altars: Saint Anthony of Padua, Father Anastazy Pankiewicz. Classic organs were dismantled due to the poor quality of the instrument. Electronic organs are used.

== History ==
After the canonical erection of the church in 1932, Father Anastazy Pankiewicz became the first superior. The architect Wiesław Lisowski was the author of the modernist church project and of similar Providence of God church in Łódź. The temple was blessed on 30 October 1932 by bishop Wincenty Tymieniecki. During World War II, The German occupation forces made from the church a warehouse and stables for horses, which is why in 1945 the church was dedicated for the second time.

=== Monastery ===
Monastery o. Bernardine in Łódź owes its foundation to Anastazy Pankiewicz (1882–1942). Father Anastazy bought several plots of land from the Germans and Jews in the district of Doły and built between 1932 and 1937 on a consolidated area, a three-storey edifice for a monastery and gymnasium, and a makeshift one-nave church named after Elizabeth of Hungary.

In this facility, in 1937, a private general secondary school was opened, to which Father Pankiewicz engaged, apart from the monastic catechist, only secular teachers. In 1939 following the German occupation of the city the resistance in Łódź used the . In 1939, the Germans occupied the Bernardine edifices, and the monks were displaced. They put stables and garages in the converted church. Pankiewicz was hiding at the cemetery of Saint. Wincentego near the monastery. He was discovered, arrested and deported to the concentration camp in Dachau, where he was murdered in a gas chamber on 18 July 1942. He was beatified in 1999.

Regaining independence, they returned in 1945 to Bernardines to Łódź. In the junior high school, however, they only covered the basement and the ground floor, because all floors were used by the Polish authorities to use public education, concluding a lease agreement with the monastery, which was until 1989 when the building was recovered. Earlier, in 1978, at the church of St. Elżbieta was erected a parish. After a few years, it was transformed into a Franciscan College and then dissolved. The current educational institution is called the Catholic Junior High School and High School.
