= Toya (company) =

Polish telecom provider

TOYA

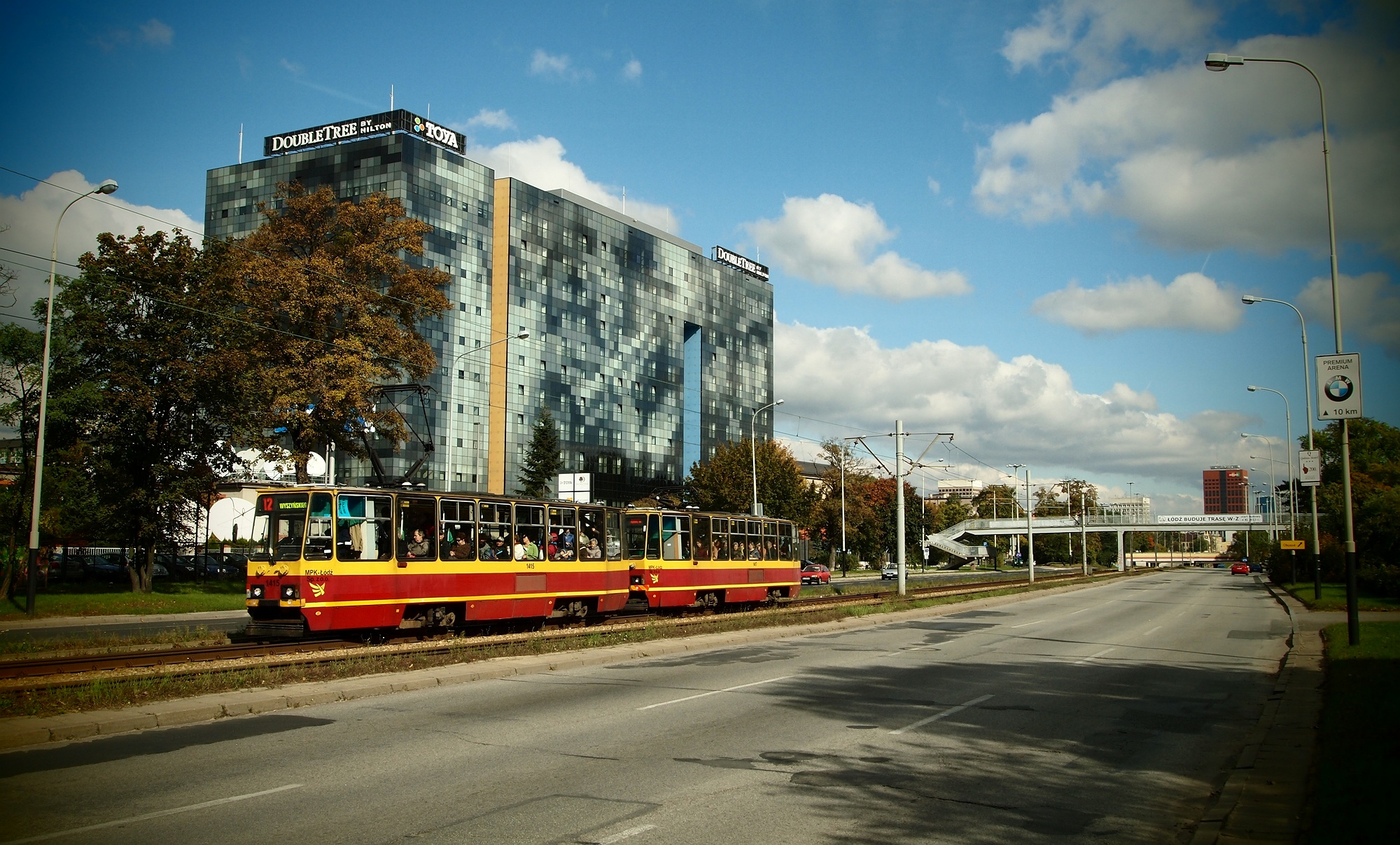
- Native name: TOYA Sp z o. o.
- Company type: Limited company
- Industry: Telecommunication
- Founded: 1991
- Founders: Witold Krawczyk; Jacek Kobierzycki
- Headquarters: Łódź, Poland
- Area served: Poland
- Products: Cable television Digital television Broadband internet Internet telephony
- ASN: 16342
- Website: TOYA.net.pl

TOYA is a Polish cable and digital television and telecommunications provider with headquarters in Łódź. The company's network covers eight cities – Łódź, Kraków, Mysłowice, Kutno, Przemyśl, Piotrków Trybunalski, Pisz and Pabianice. TOYA products and services are available in thirteen partner networks of other operators across 25 locations.

== History and development ==
The limited company was founded in 1991 in Łódź by Witold Krawczyk and Jacek Kobierzycki. It was one of the first Polish companies permitted to offer Internet services – as early as 1999; the following year it had 1000 subscribers. In 2004 the service was extended to include subscribers in Przemyśl and Mysłowice.

By early 2006, TOYA's network in the eight cities covered over 80% of the area of each city. In October 2008, TOYA took over Pol-Net – a cable TV company from Piotrków Trybunalski; in 2017 it acquired the Kraków-based T-MONT.

According to the Polish Chamber for Electronic Communication (PIKE), the number of TOYA's subscribers in March 2010 was approximately 160,000 – the company came fourth on the list of the largest cable network operators in Poland. The 2017 PIKE statistics position TOYA in fifth place, with 175,000 subscribers in July. Additionally, the company provides access to its services to around 90,000 subscribers of partner networks.

TOYA was the first Polish cable TV provider to offer triple play (Internet, telephone, and TV) model packages to its customers.

== Products and services ==
=== Television ===
The company delivers over 250 television channels both via analog TV and its own High Definition digital platform.

=== Internet ===
TOYA delivers Internet connections based on the DOCSIS and GPON technologies. The company offers its customers a variety of Internet packages of varying speeds (from 300 to 940 Mbit/s). Internet signal is transmitted through Cisco cable modems (DOCSIS) and Huawei ONTs (GPON). According to a ranking by Speedtest.pl, in 2017 TOYA offered the fastest cable broadband Internet in Poland.

=== VoIP ===
TOYA provides VoIP telephony.

=== Mobile services ===
TOYA offers mobile phone and mobile Internet connections via the PLAY network.

== Toya Group ==
=== TOYA Studios ===
TOYA Studios is a group of recording, production and post-production studios for both audio and film. The studios are located at Łąkowa 29 in Łódź and previously belonged to the Łódź Feature Film Studios, which operated between 1945 and 1998 and produced several award-winning postwar pictures directed by Jerzy Kawalerowicz, Krzysztof Kieślowski, Roman Polanski and many others. The studio complex has been revitalized and now consists of sixteen studio and sound edit suites and two large halls which can accommodate up to 1200 and up to 2500 people. The studios deliver a few hundred hours of new audio for films and other productions every month, and have produced sound for over two hundred contemporary feature films.

=== Wytwórnia Club ===
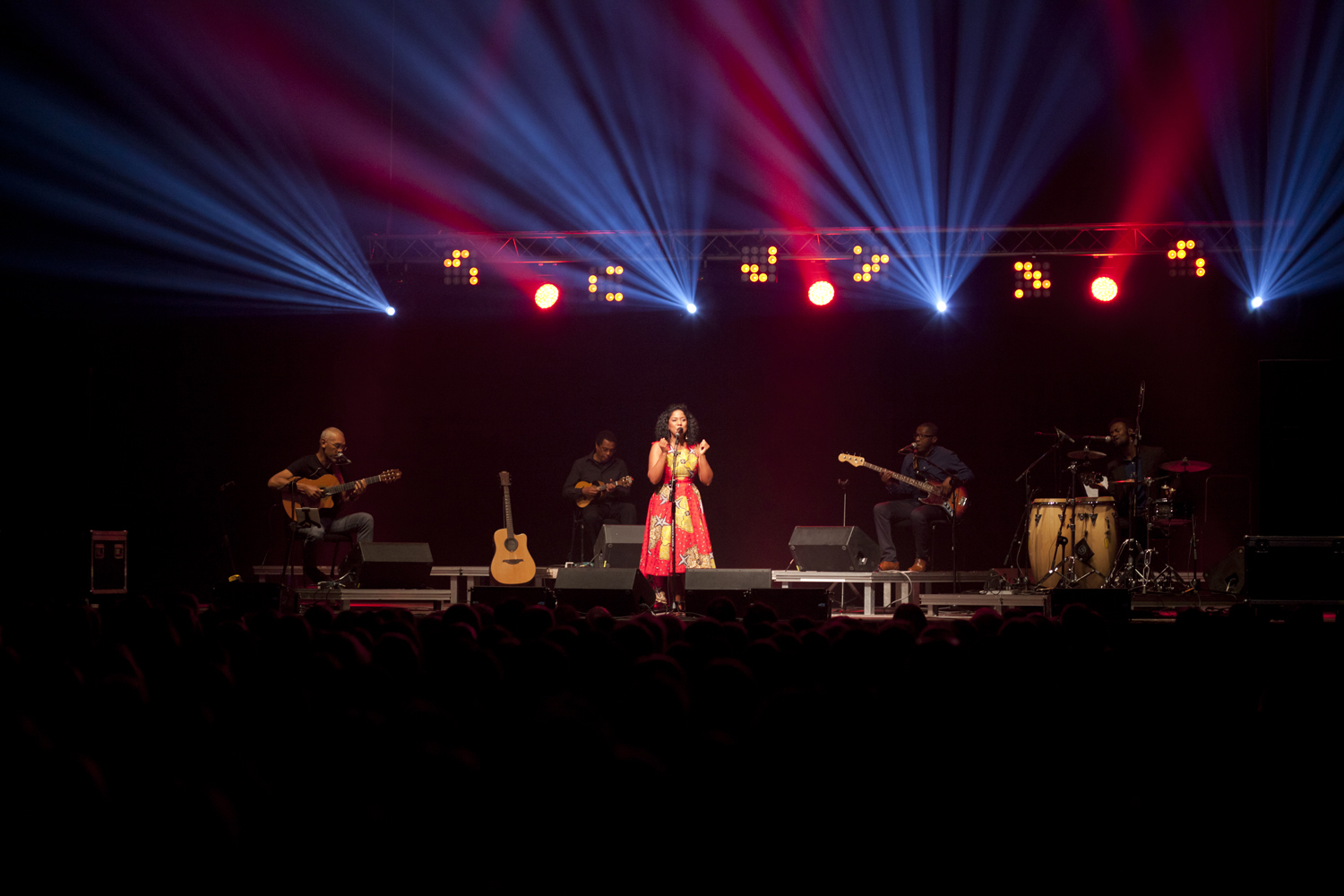
Nancy Vieira performing at Wytwórnia, 2016

Wytwórnia Club belongs to the Toya Group and is one of the largest, most active and progressive music and arts venues in Łódź. The club runs a regular programme of around 100 events per year, including music concerts, festivals, film screenings, theatrical performances and art exhibitions. Artists who performed at Wytwórnia include Jan Garbarek, Tomasz Stańko, Chris Botti, Courtney Love, Michał Urbaniak, Al Di Meola and Gary Numan.
