= Hanna Ożogowska =

Polish novelist and poet (1904–1995)

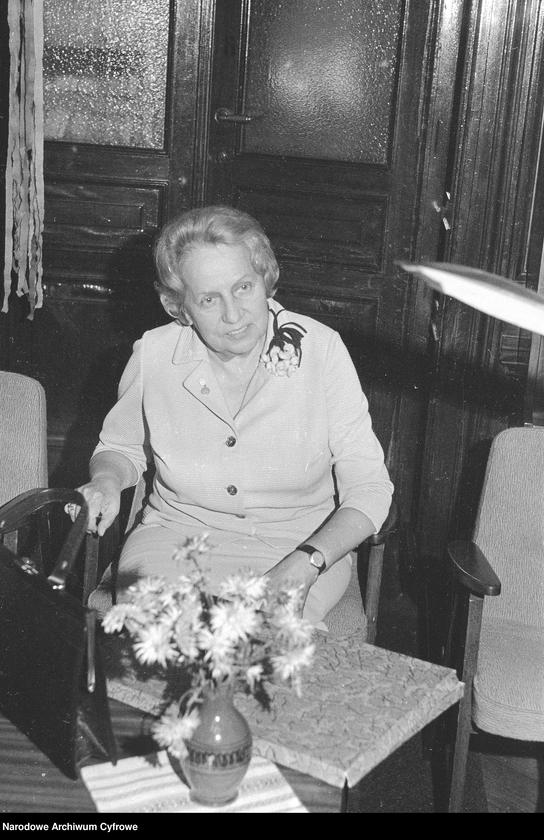
- Hanna Ożogowska, 1974
- Born: 20 July 1904; Warsaw
- Died: 27 May 1995 (aged 90); Warsaw
- Occupations: Novelist, poet

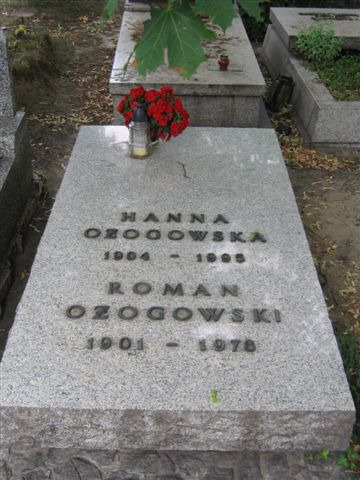
The grave of Hanna Ożogowska at Powązki Cemetery, Warsaw, 30 July 2006

Hanna Ożogowska (20 July 1904 – 27 May 1995) was a Polish novelist and poet.

== Biography ==
She graduated from Special Pedagogy Institute and Pedagogy Faculty of Free Polish University (Wolna Wszechnica Polska). She debuted in 1932 in a weekly magazine Płomyk as a child literature author. She worked in secondary schooling in Łódź till 1951. After World War II she was the president of Pedagogical Secondary School for Kindergarten Educators in Łódź. She was the editor of Płomyk.

== Prizes ==
- 1956 - Golden Cross of Merit
- 1959 - Prime Minister's Award
- 1967 - Medal of the National Education Commission
- 1968 - Knight's Cross of the Order of Polonia Restituta
- 1974 - Order of the Smile (Order Uśmiechu)
- 1974 & 1981 - Eagle's Feather prize (Orle Pióro)
- 1979 - the title of "Distinguished Teacher of the PRL"
- 1984 - State Prize
- 1984 - Golden Cross of Merit of the Polish Scouting and Guiding Association
- 1984 - Commander's Cross of the Order of Polonia Restituta
- 1985 - Award of the City of Warsaw

== Bibliography ==
- 1950 O ślimaku, co pierogów z serem szukał
- 1950 Uczniowie III klasy
- 1951 Na Karolewskiej
- 1952 Swoimi słowami
- 1953 Nową drogą przez nowy most
- 1955 W Marcelkowej klasie
- 1955 Bajka o kłosku pszenicy
- 1957 Malowany wózek
- 1957 Marcinkowe wierszyki
- 1957 Złota kula
- 1959 Tajemnica zielonej pieczęci
- 1960 O królewnie, która bała się, że jej korona z głowy spadnie
- 1960 Scyzoryk i koledzy
- 1960 Chłopak na opak czyli Z pamiętnika pechowego Jacka
- 1961 Dziewczyna i chłopak czyli Heca na czternaście fajerwerek (film adaptation: Dziewczyna i chłopak)
- 1963 Raz, gdy chciałem być szlachetny
- 1964 Herring's Ear (Ucho od śledzia) (entered on the IBBY Honour List in 1966)
- 1968 Głowa na tranzystorach
- 1971 Koleżanki
- 1972 Za minutę pierwsza miłość
- 1980 Przygody Scyzoryka
- 1983 Entliczki pentliczki
- 1987 Lusterko dla każdej dziewczyny
- 1989 Druga klasa - fajna klasa!
- 1989 Piórko do pióreczka
