= Stauntonia crassifolia =

Scientific classification
- Kingdom: Plantae
- Clade: Tracheophytes
- Clade: Angiosperms
- Clade: Eudicots
- Order: Ranunculales
- Family: Lardizabalaceae
- Genus: Stauntonia
- Species: S. crassifolia

Binomial name
- Stauntonia crassifolia (H.N.Qin) Christenh.

Synonyms
- Holboellia crassifolia H.N. Qin

Species of flowering plant

Stauntonia crassifolia is a plant in the family Lardizabalaceae. The native range of this species is Myanmar. It is a subshrub and grows primarily in the subtropical biome.
