= Stauntonia angustifolia =

Scientific classification
- Kingdom: Plantae
- Clade: Tracheophytes
- Clade: Angiosperms
- Clade: Eudicots
- Order: Ranunculales
- Family: Lardizabalaceae
- Genus: Stauntonia
- Species: S. angustifolia

Binomial name
- Stauntonia angustifolia Wall.

Synonyms
- Stauntonia longipes Hemsl. Holboellia marmorata Hand.-Mazz. Holboellia latifolia var. obtusa Gagnep. Holboellia latifolia var. bracteata Gagnep. Holboellia latifolia var. acuminata (Lindl.) Gagnep. Holboellia latifolia Franch. Holboellia fargesii Reaub. Holboellia angustifolia subsp. trifoliata H.N. Qin; Holboellia angustifolia subsp. obtusa (Gagnep.) H.N. Qin; Holboellia angustifolia var. minima Reaub. Holboellia angustifolia var. angustissima Diels; Holboellia angustifolia Wall. Holboellia angustifolia Diels; Holboellia acuminata Lindl.

Species of flowering plant

Stauntonia angustifolia is a plant in the family Lardizabalaceae.
