= Stauntonia chapaensis =

Scientific classification
- Kingdom: Plantae
- Clade: Tracheophytes
- Clade: Angiosperms
- Clade: Eudicots
- Order: Ranunculales
- Family: Lardizabalaceae
- Genus: Stauntonia
- Species: S. chapaensis

Binomial name
- Stauntonia chapaensis (Gagnep.) Christenh.

Synonyms
- Holboellia reticulata C.Y. Wu; Holboellia chapaensis Gagnep.

Species of flowering plant

Stauntonia chapaensis is a plant in the family Lardizabalaceae. The native range of this species is China (Yunnan, Guangxi) to Vietnam. It is a liana and grows primarily in the subtropical biome.
