= Stauntonia brunoniana =

Scientific classification
- Kingdom: Plantae
- Clade: Tracheophytes
- Clade: Angiosperms
- Clade: Eudicots
- Order: Ranunculales
- Family: Lardizabalaceae
- Genus: Stauntonia
- Species: S. brunoniana

Binomial name
- Stauntonia brunoniana (Decne.) W.B. Hemsley

Synonyms
- Stauntonia trifoliata Griff. Parvatia brunoniana Decne.

Species of flowering plant

Stauntonia brunoniana is a plant in the family Lardizabalaceae. It is distributed in Vietnam, India, Myanmar, and Yunnan in mainland China, and grows at an altitude of 900 to 1,500 meters above sea level, generally in mountain forests.
