= Stauntonia trinervia =

Scientific classification
- Kingdom: Plantae
- Clade: Tracheophytes
- Clade: Angiosperms
- Clade: Eudicots
- Order: Ranunculales
- Family: Lardizabalaceae
- Genus: Stauntonia
- Species: S. trinervia

Binomial name
- Stauntonia trinervia Merrill

Synonyms
- Stauntonia crassipes T.C.Chen

Species of flowering plant

Stauntonia trinervia is a plant in the family Lardizabalaceae. It is distributed in Guangdong and other parts of mainland China, and grows at an altitude of 350 to 500 meters above sea level in open forests beside water in valleys.
