= Stauntonia cavalerieana =

Scientific classification
- Kingdom: Plantae
- Clade: Tracheophytes
- Clade: Angiosperms
- Clade: Eudicots
- Order: Ranunculales
- Family: Lardizabalaceae
- Genus: Stauntonia
- Species: S. cavalerieana

Binomial name
- Stauntonia cavalerieana Gagnep.

Species of flowering plant

Stauntonia cavalerieana is a plant in the family Lardizabalaceae. It is endemic to China.
