= Stauntonia maculata =

Scientific classification
- Kingdom: Plantae
- Clade: Tracheophytes
- Clade: Angiosperms
- Clade: Eudicots
- Order: Ranunculales
- Family: Lardizabalaceae
- Genus: Stauntonia
- Species: S. maculata

Binomial name
- Stauntonia maculata Merrill

Species of flowering plant

Stauntonia maculata is a plant in the family Lardizabalaceae. The native range of this species is China (Guangdong, Fujian). It is a climber and grows primarily in the subtropical biome, at an altitude of 600 to 1,000 meters above sea level. It is mostly found in open forests in mountainous areas or in sunny places beside streams in valleys.

The name maculata refers to the spots on its leaves.
