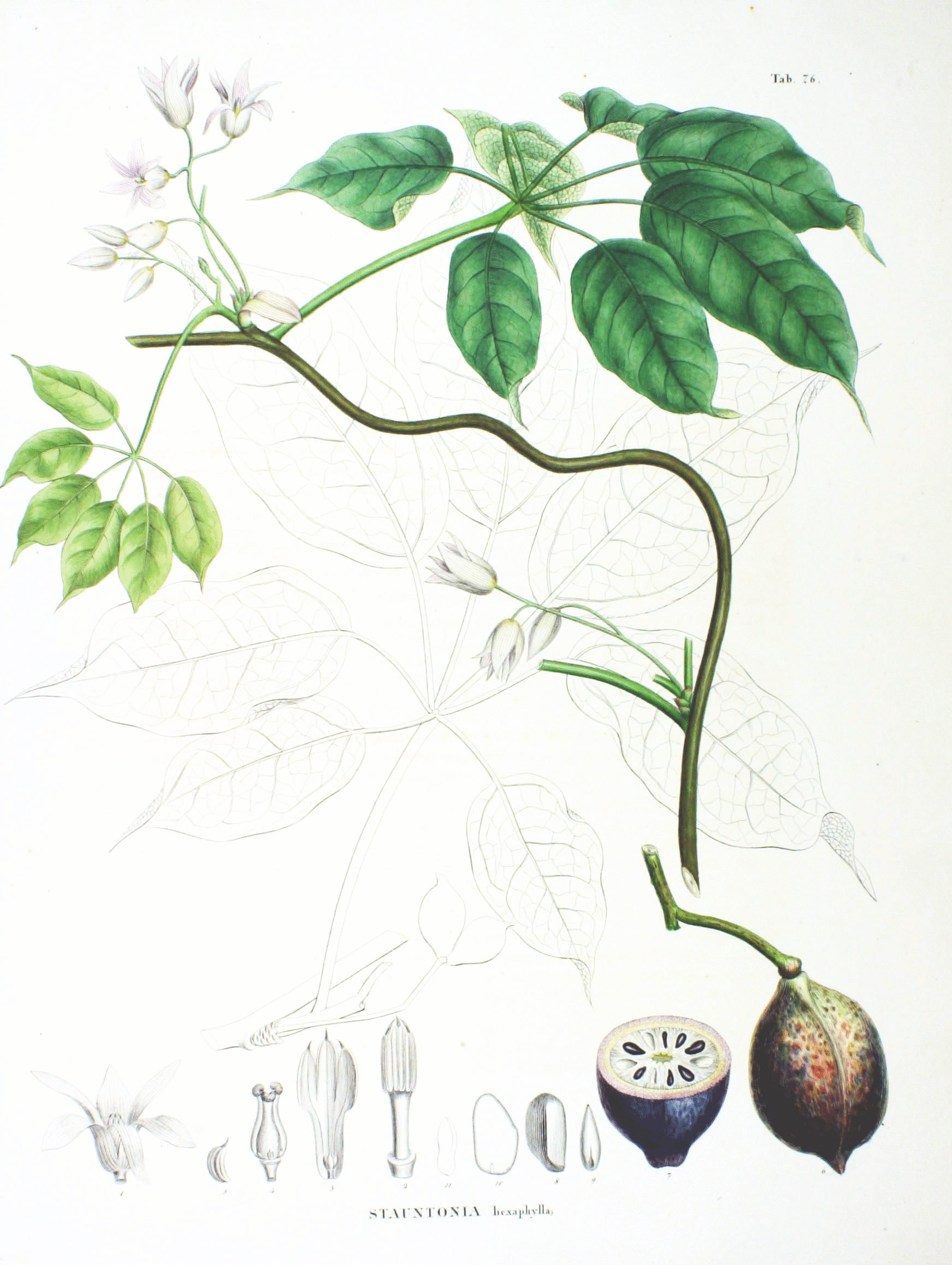

Scientific classification
- Kingdom: Plantae
- Clade: Tracheophytes
- Clade: Angiosperms
- Clade: Eudicots
- Order: Ranunculales
- Family: Lardizabalaceae
- Genus: Stauntonia
- Species: S. hexaphylla

Binomial name
- Stauntonia hexaphylla (Thunb.) Decne.

Synonyms
- Stauntonia hexaphylla var. rotundata Wu; Stauntonia hexaphylla var. obovata Wu; Stauntonia hexaphylla var. cordata Li

= Stauntonia hexaphylla =

Species of flowering plant

Stauntonia hexaphylla or Stauntonia vine is a plant in the family Lardizabalaceae.

In Japan, it is distributed in Honshu, Shikoku, Kyushu, and Okinawa. Outside Japan it is found in South Korea. It grows wild in mountains and hills in warm regions and near the coast. Outside of its natural distribution, it is sometimes planted in gardens as shade shelves.

In Japanese it is called Mube (ムベ, or 郁子).
