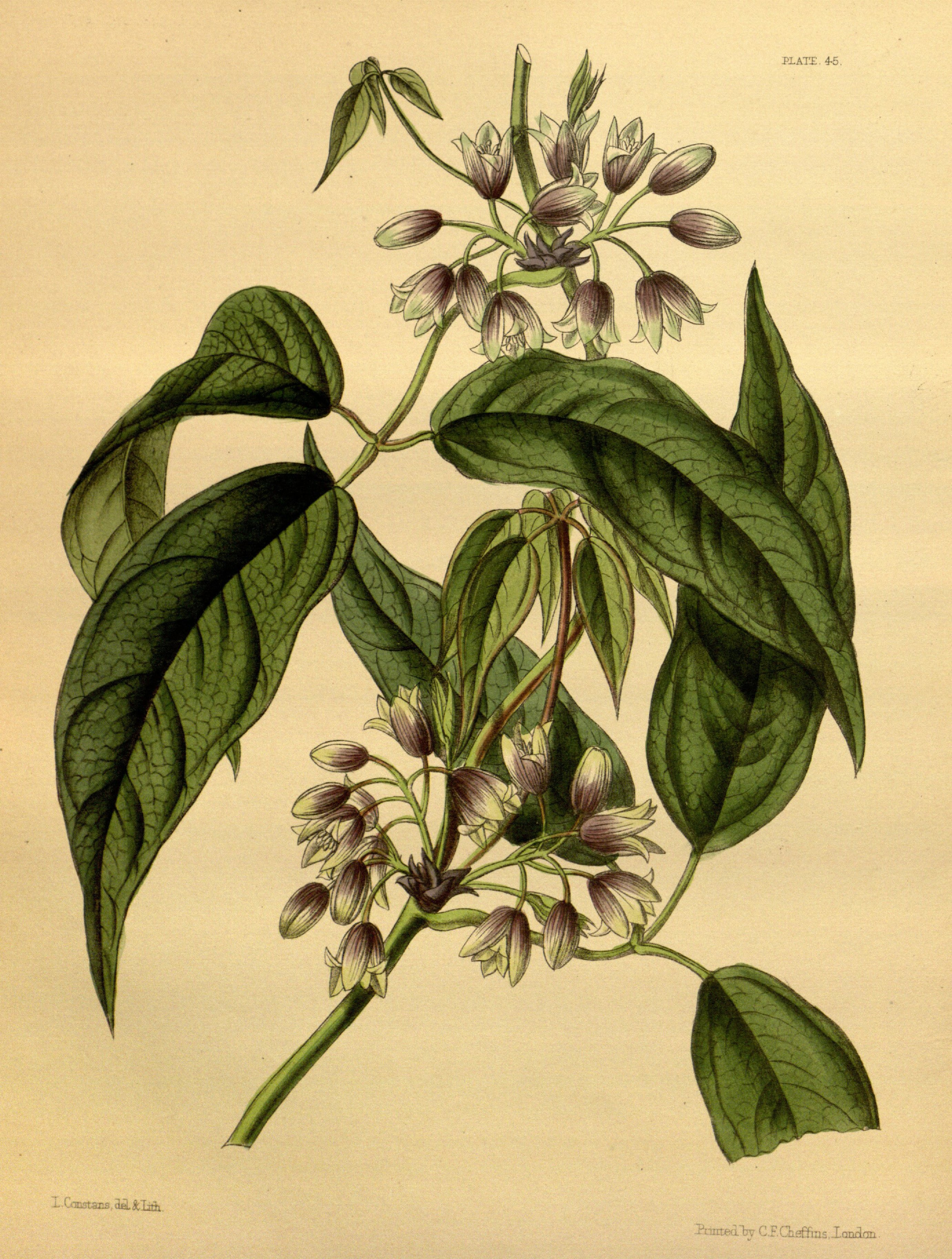

Scientific classification
- Kingdom: Plantae
- Clade: Tracheophytes
- Clade: Angiosperms
- Clade: Eudicots
- Order: Ranunculales
- Family: Lardizabalaceae
- Genus: Stauntonia
- Species: S. latifolia

Binomial name
- Stauntonia latifolia Wall.

= Stauntonia latifolia =

Species of flowering plant

Stauntonia latifolia (syn. Holboellia latifolia Wall.) is a perennial ornamental plant in the family Lardizabalaceae.
