= Stauntonia brachyandra =

Scientific classification
- Kingdom: Plantae
- Clade: Tracheophytes
- Clade: Angiosperms
- Clade: Eudicots
- Order: Ranunculales
- Family: Lardizabalaceae
- Genus: Stauntonia
- Species: S. brachyandra

Binomial name
- Stauntonia brachyandra (H.N.Qin) Christenh.

Synonyms
- Holboellia brachyandra H.N. Qin

Species of flowering plant

Stauntonia brachyandra is a plant in the family Lardizabalaceae.
