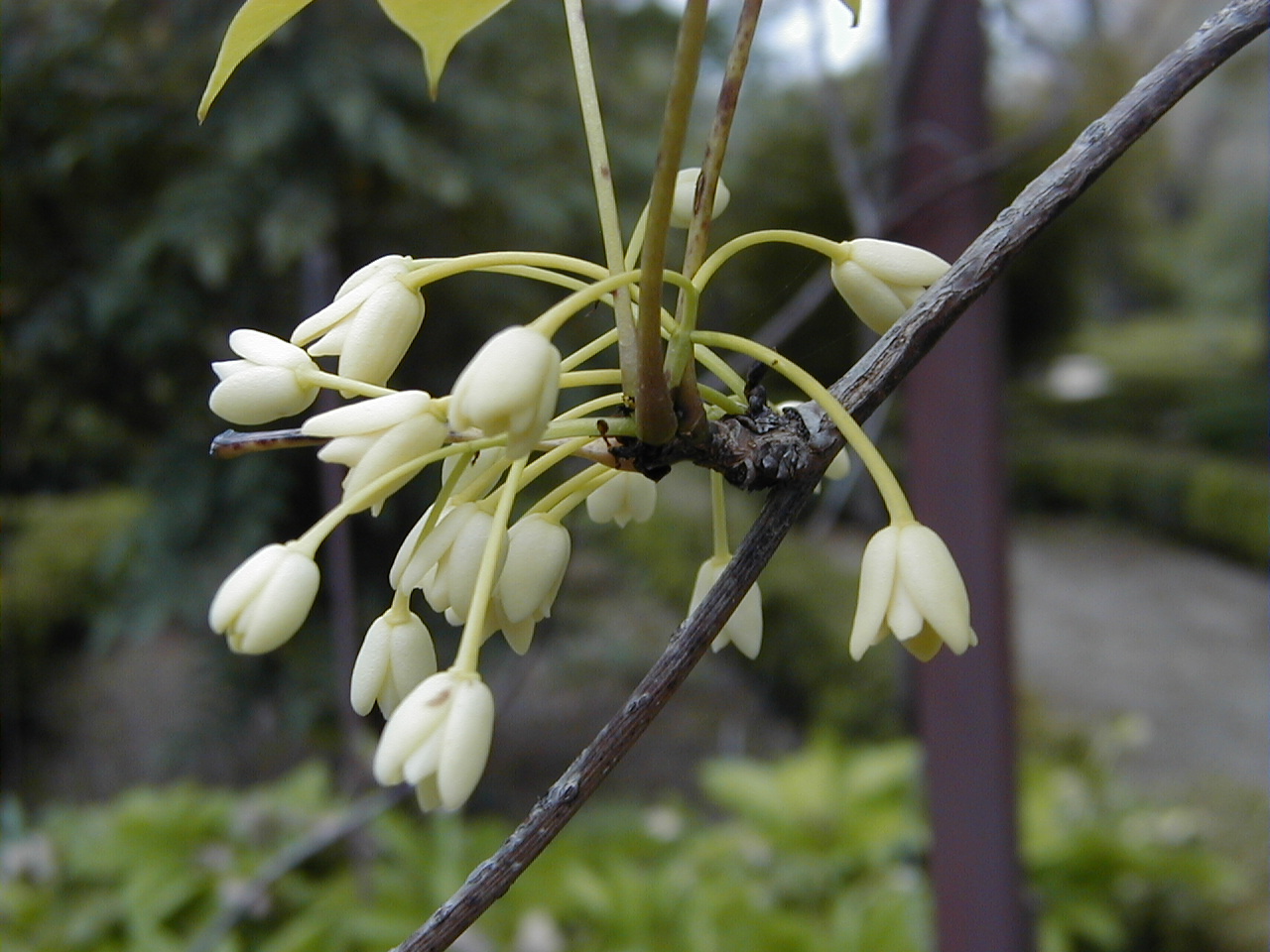

Scientific classification
- Kingdom: Plantae
- Clade: Tracheophytes
- Clade: Angiosperms
- Clade: Eudicots
- Order: Ranunculales
- Family: Lardizabalaceae
- Genus: Stauntonia
- Species: S. coriacea

Binomial name
- Stauntonia coriacea (Diels) Christenh.

Synonyms
- Holboellia coriacea Diels; Holboellia brevipes (Hemsl.) P.C.Kuo; Holboellia coriacea var. angustifolia Pamp.; Stauntonia brevipes Hemsl.

= Stauntonia coriacea =

Species of flowering plant

Stauntonia coriacea, commonly known as blue china vine, is an evergreen liana indigenous to temperate east Asia. The leaves have a waxy texture. It produces white monoecious flowers followed by pink-colored sausage-shaped fruits with white-colored pulp. The fruits are, technically, berries. They ripen and drop during autumn. The fruits are edible, but are not commonly used as food. It is often grown as an ornamental plant.
