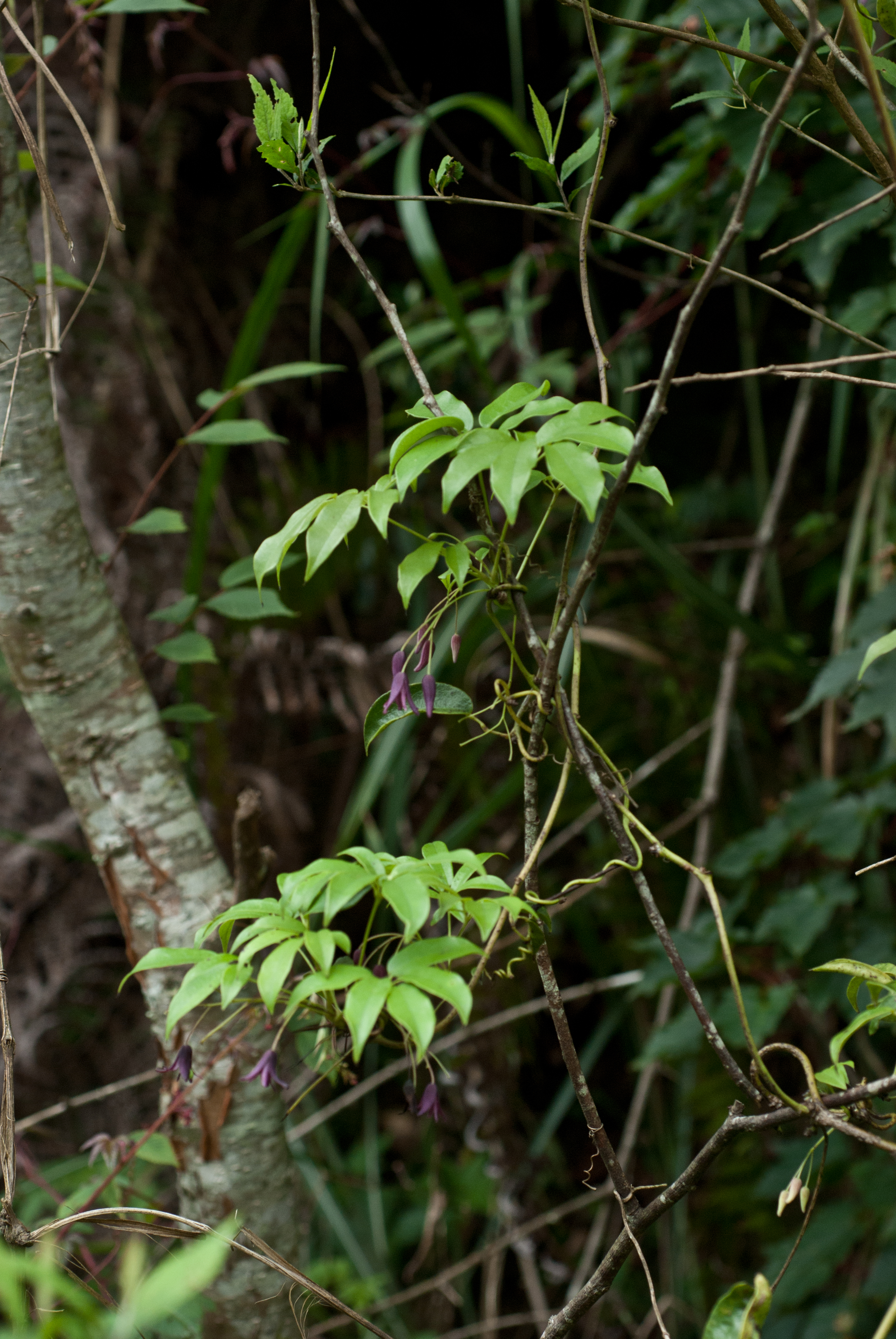

Scientific classification
- Kingdom: Plantae
- Clade: Tracheophytes
- Clade: Angiosperms
- Clade: Eudicots
- Order: Ranunculales
- Family: Lardizabalaceae
- Genus: Stauntonia
- Species: S. purpurea

Binomial name
- Stauntonia purpurea Y.C.Liu & F.Y. Lu

= Stauntonia purpurea =

Species of flowering plant

Stauntonia purpurea is a plant in the family Lardizabalaceae. It is a climber endemic to central Taiwan.
