= Stauntonia filamentosa =

Scientific classification
- Kingdom: Plantae
- Clade: Tracheophytes
- Clade: Angiosperms
- Clade: Eudicots
- Order: Ranunculales
- Family: Lardizabalaceae
- Genus: Stauntonia
- Species: S. filamentosa

Binomial name
- Stauntonia filamentosa Griff.

Synonyms
- Holboellia filamentosa (Griff.) H.N.Qin; Parvatia filamentosa (Griff.) Gagnep.; Holboellia khasiana T.K.Paul & M.P.Nayar; Stauntonia racemosa Chatterjee

Species of flowering plant

Stauntonia filamentosa is a plant in the family Lardizabalaceae.

The native range of this species is Assam to northern Myanmar. It is a climber and grows primarily in the subtropical biome.
