= Stauntonia conspicua =

Scientific classification
- Kingdom: Plantae
- Clade: Tracheophytes
- Clade: Angiosperms
- Clade: Eudicots
- Order: Ranunculales
- Family: Lardizabalaceae
- Genus: Stauntonia
- Species: S. conspicua

Binomial name
- Stauntonia conspicua R.H. Chang

Species of flowering plant

Stauntonia conspicua is a plant in the family Lardizabalaceae. It is endemic to China, distributed in Zhejiang Province in mainland China. It grows at an altitude of 1,300 to 1,600 meters above sea level, often in dense forests on mountain slopes.
