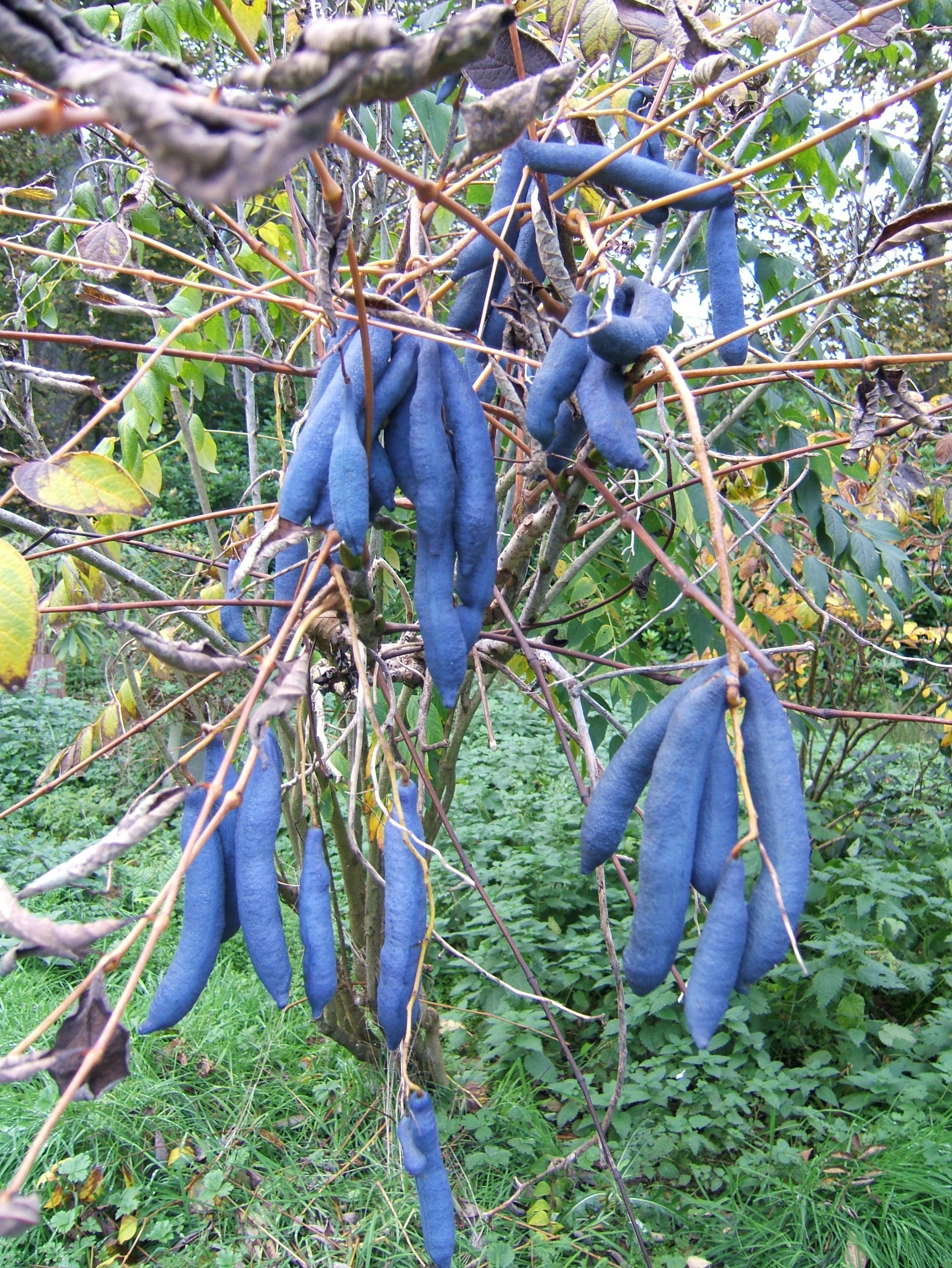

Scientific classification
- Kingdom: Plantae
- Clade: Tracheophytes
- Clade: Angiosperms
- Clade: Eudicots
- Order: Ranunculales
- Family: Lardizabalaceae
- Genus: Decaisnea
- Species: D. fargesii

Binomial name
- Decaisnea fargesii Franch.

= Decaisnea fargesii =

Species of flowering plant

Decaisnea fargesii, the blue sausage fruit, blue bean shrub, or dead men's fingers, is a member of the family Lardizabalaceae, and is native to Nepal, Tibet and China. It is a deciduous shrub that grows to 4 m tall and broad, but may achieve 8 m (26 ft) eventually.

It has divided leaves up to 90 cm (35 in) long, but its main attraction is the pendant bean-like pods, which appear in autumn, and are an unusual blue-grey colour. It is hardy to −20 °C (−4 °F) or lower and prefers a sheltered position.

The species was first described in 1892 by French botanist Adrien René Franchet.

Both the online Flora of China and Global Biodiversity Information Facility (GBIF) do not consider this a separate species from Decaisnea insignis, but Plants of the World Online does.

== See also ==
- Meiogyne cylindrocarpa (fingersop)
