= Stauntonia grandiflora =

Scientific classification
- Kingdom: Plantae
- Clade: Tracheophytes
- Clade: Angiosperms
- Clade: Eudicots
- Order: Ranunculales
- Family: Lardizabalaceae
- Genus: Stauntonia
- Species: S. grandiflora

Binomial name
- Stauntonia grandiflora (Réaub.) Christenh.

Synonyms
- Holboellia grandiflora Reaub.

Species of flowering plant

Stauntonia grandiflora is a plant in the family Lardizabalaceae. The native range of this species is South-Central China to Vietnam. It is a climber and grows primarily in the temperate biome.
