= Stauntonia yaoshanensis =

Scientific classification
- Kingdom: Plantae
- Clade: Tracheophytes
- Clade: Angiosperms
- Clade: Eudicots
- Order: Ranunculales
- Family: Lardizabalaceae
- Genus: Stauntonia
- Species: S. yaoshanensis

Binomial name
- Stauntonia yaoshanensis F.N. Wei & S.L. Mo

Species of flowering plant

Stauntonia yaoshanensis is a species of flowering plant in the family Lardizabalaceae. Its native range is Guangxi and other provinces of southeast China. It is a climber and grows primarily in the subtropical biome.
