= Stauntonia obovata =

Scientific classification
- Kingdom: Plantae
- Clade: Tracheophytes
- Clade: Angiosperms
- Clade: Eudicots
- Order: Ranunculales
- Family: Lardizabalaceae
- Genus: Stauntonia
- Species: S. obovata

Binomial name
- Stauntonia obovata Hemsl.

Synonyms
- Stauntonia obovata var. angustata (Y. C. Wu) Li; Stauntonia keitaoensis Hayata; Stauntonia hexandra var. angustata Y. C. Wu; Stauntonia hexandra Hayata; Holboellia obovata var. angustata (Wu) Li; Holboellia obovata (Hemsl.) Chun; Akebia cavaleriei Leveille

Species of flowering plant

Stauntonia obovata is a plant in the family Lardizabalaceae. It is distributed in Taiwan and mainland China in Guangdong, Sichuan, Fujian, Guangxi, Jiangxi, Hong Kong, Hunan and other places. It grows in areas with an altitude of 300 to 800 meters, mostly in open forests or dense forests in mountain valleys.
