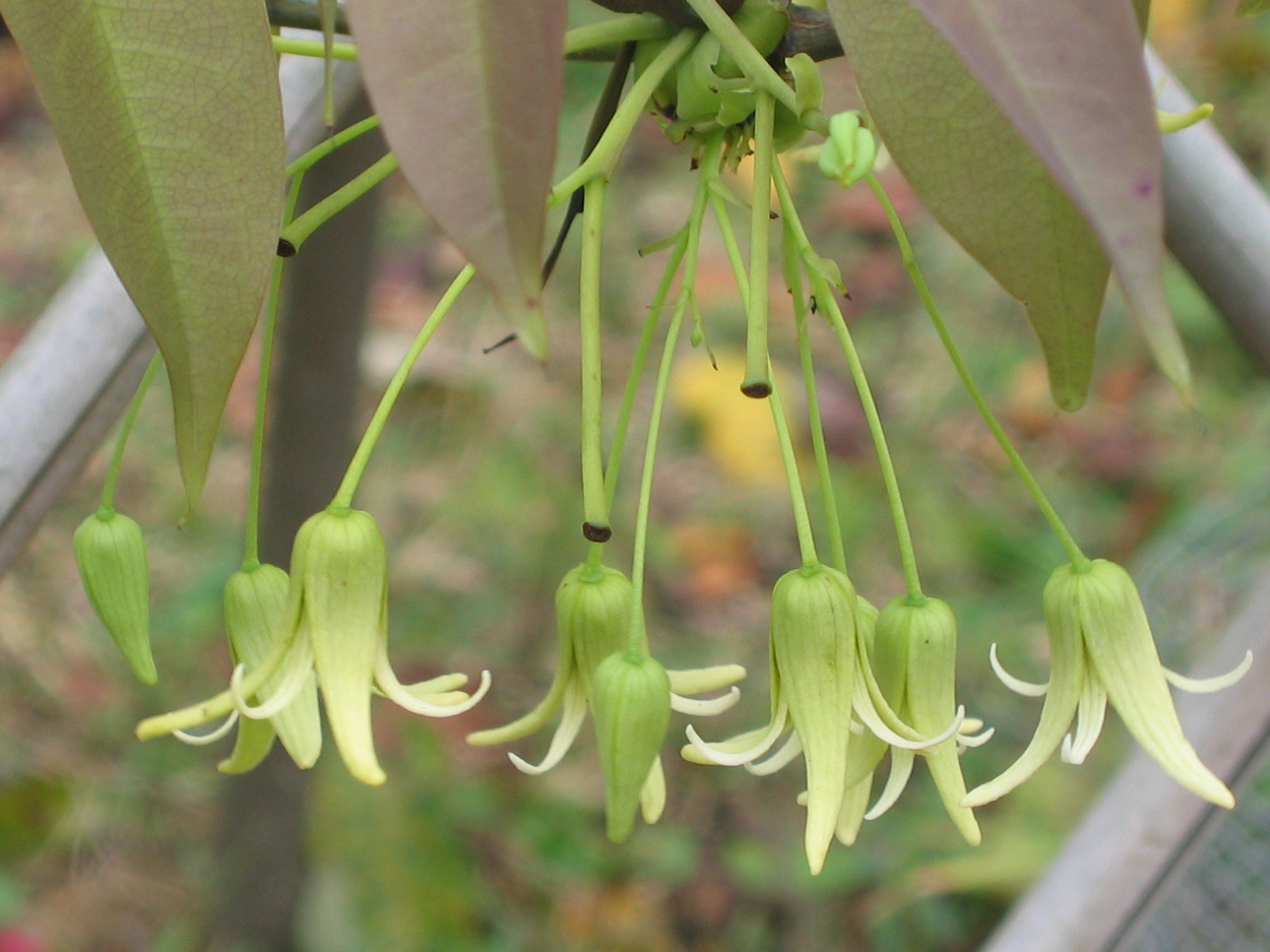

Scientific classification
- Kingdom: Plantae
- Clade: Tracheophytes
- Clade: Angiosperms
- Clade: Eudicots
- Order: Ranunculales
- Family: Lardizabalaceae
- Genus: Stauntonia
- Species: S. chinensis

Binomial name
- Stauntonia chinensis DC.

Synonyms
- Stauntonia hainanensis T.C.Chen

= Stauntonia chinensis =

Species of flowering plant

Stauntonia chinensis is a plant in the family Lardizabalaceae. It is endemic to China, where it is distributed in Yunnan, Guangxi, Guangdong, Zhejiang, Jiangxi, Fujian, Hunan, Anhui, Hong Kong, Guizhou and other places. It grows at an altitude of 500 meters to 1,300 meters above sea level and can be found in dense forests in mountainous areas, thickets on the hillside or sparse forests along the streams in valleys.
