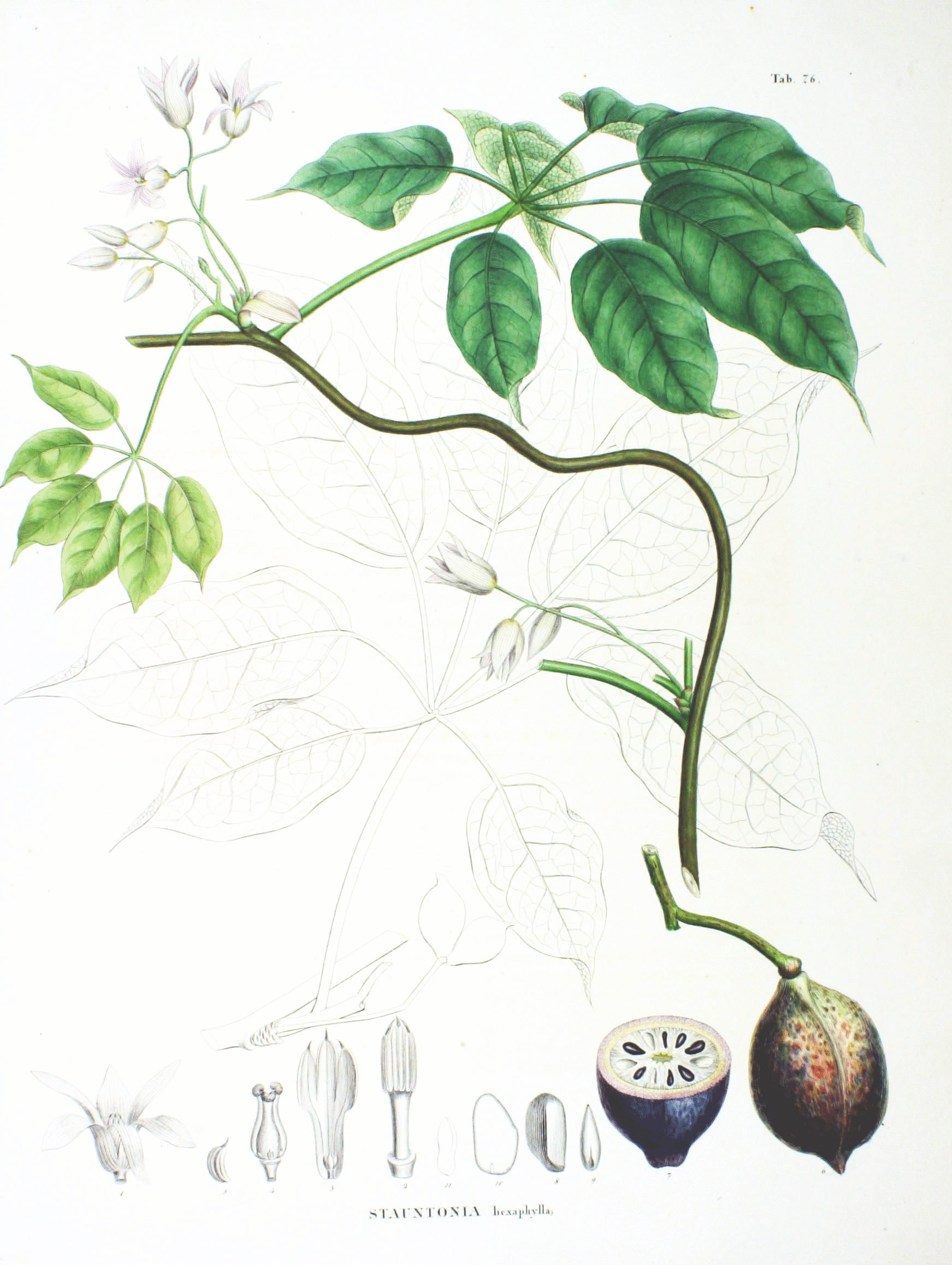
- Stauntonia hexaphylla

Scientific classification
- Kingdom: Plantae
- Clade: Tracheophytes
- Clade: Angiosperms
- Clade: Eudicots
- Order: Ranunculales
- Family: Lardizabalaceae
- Genus: Stauntonia; DC.

Species
- See text

Synonyms
- Holboellia Wall.; Parvatia Decne.

= Stauntonia =

Genus of flowering plants

Stauntonia is a genus of flowering plants in the family Lardizabalaceae. It is named after George Staunton, who brought it to Britain from China in the 19th century.

== Species ==
Species accepted by the Plants of the World Online as of March 2023:

- Stauntonia angustifolia (Wall.) R.Br. ex Wall.
- Stauntonia brachyandra (H.N.Qin) Christenh.
- Stauntonia brunoniana (Decne.) Wall. ex Hemsl.
- Stauntonia cavalerieana Gagnep.
- Stauntonia chapaensis (Gagnep.) Christenh.
- Stauntonia chinensis DC.
- Stauntonia conspicua R.H.Chang
- Stauntonia coriacea (Diels) Christenh.
- Stauntonia crassifolia (H.N.Qin) Christenh.
- Stauntonia decora (Dunn) C.Y.Wu
- Stauntonia duclouxii Gagnep.
- Stauntonia filamentosa Griff.
- Stauntonia grandiflora (Réaub.) Christenh.
- Stauntonia hexaphylla (Thunb.) Decne.
- Stauntonia latifolia (Wall.) R.Br. ex Wall.
- Stauntonia libera H.N.Qin
- Stauntonia linearifolia (T.Chen & H.N.Qin) Christenh.
- Stauntonia maculata Merr.
- Stauntonia medogensis (H.N.Qin) Christenh.
- Stauntonia obcordatilimba C.Y.Wu & S.H.Huang
- Stauntonia obovata Hemsl.
- Stauntonia obovatifoliola Hayata
- Stauntonia oligophylla Merr. & Chun
- Stauntonia parviflora Hemsl.
- Stauntonia pterocaulis (T.Chen & Q.H.Chen) Christenh.
- Stauntonia purpurea Y.C.Liu & F.Y.Lu
- Stauntonia trinervia Merr.
- Stauntonia yaoshanensis F.N.Wei & S.L.Mo
