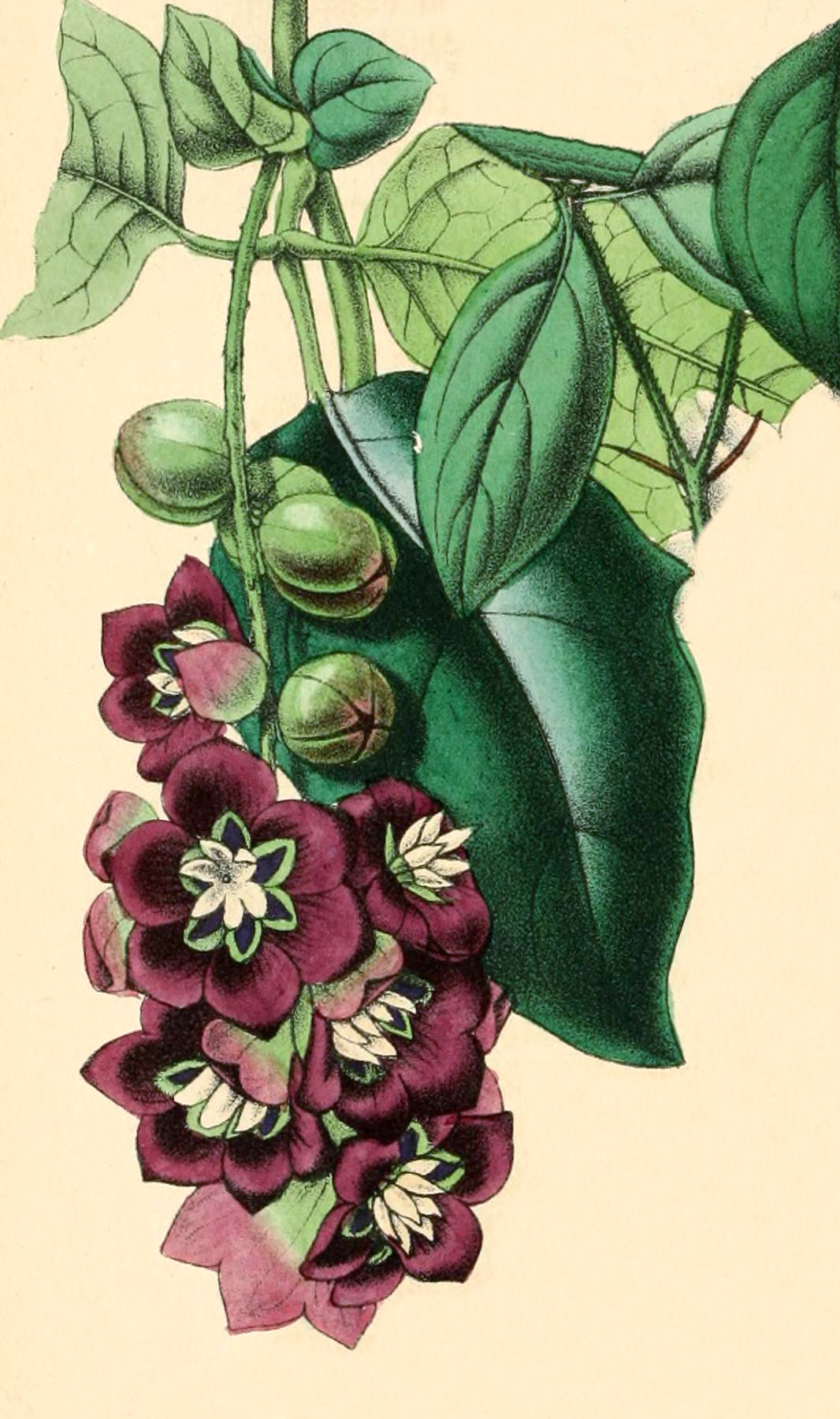
- Botanical illustration, 1853

Scientific classification
- Kingdom: Plantae
- Clade: Tracheophytes
- Clade: Angiosperms
- Clade: Eudicots
- Order: Ranunculales
- Family: Lardizabalaceae
- Genus: Lardizabala; Ruiz & Pav.
- Species: L. biternata

Binomial name
- Lardizabala biternata Ruiz & Pav.

Synonyms
- Cogylia Molina; Dolichos funarius Molina; Cogylia biternata (Ruiz & Pav.) Molina; Cogylia ternata (Molina) Molina; Cogylia triternata (Ruiz & Pav.) Molina; Lardizabala biternata Ruiz & Pav.; Lardizabala infusiata Miers; Lardizabala silvicola Miers; Lardizabala ternata Molina; Lardizabala triternata Ruiz & Pav.

= Lardizabala =

Genus of plants

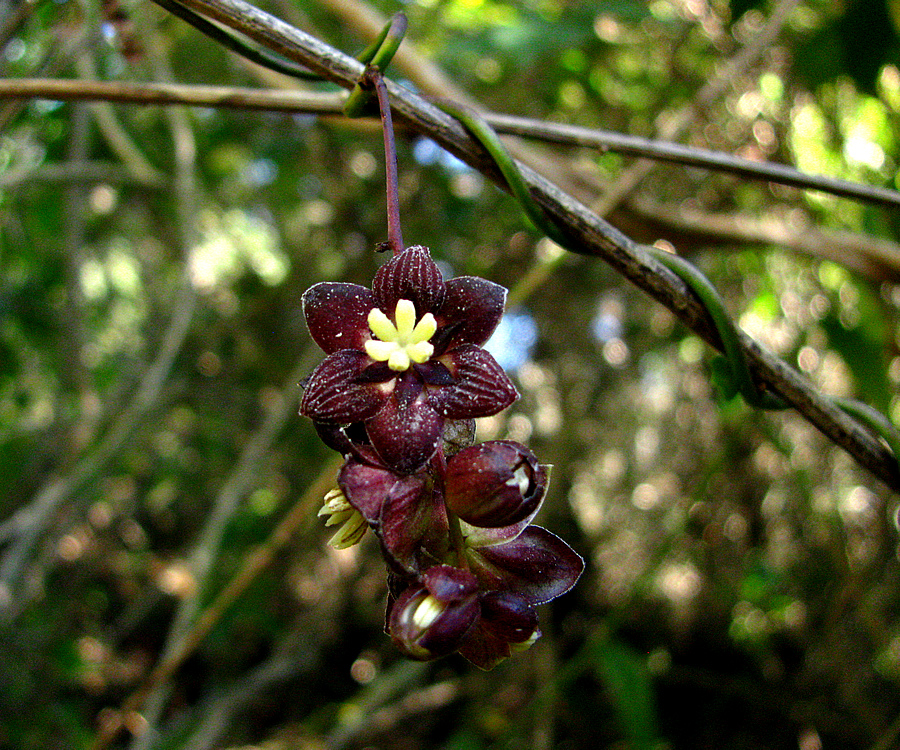
Flowers of Lardizabala biternata

Lardizabala is a monotypic genus of flowering plants in the order Ranunculales. The sole species in the genus is Lardizabala biternata, known as Lardizabala or Zabala fruit. This species is an evergreen liana, native to temperate forests of central and southern Chile. It is grown for its edible fruits and ornamental flowers.

== Morphology ==
Lardizabala biternata is a dioecious vine, with leaves compound in threes. Flowers of this species are all deep red to violet in color, with males growing in pendant clusters, and female flowers growing as singular individuals. Petals and sepals are both fleshy, and appear in two whorls of six. Female flowers produce fleshy fruits with many black seeds. Tissues from this plant were found to contain Oleanolic acid.

== Ecology ==
Lardizabala biternata is rare, and endemic to a small geographic region inclusive of the Chilean Winter Rainfall Valdivian-Forest biodiversity hotspot.

The seeds present in the large edible fruits of this species are hypothesized to have been dispersed by extinct Pleistocene megafauna. Currently, foxes of the genus Lycalopex are thought to play the main seed dispersal role in its natural habitat.

== Taxonomy ==
Indigenous names for this species is Nüpu-foki, with fruits known as Kówell or Cóguil.

The taxonomic authority for this species is Hipólito Ruiz López and José Antonio Pavón Jiménez, with type specimens first collected in Chile. The genus Lardizabala, was named for Miguel de Lardizabal y Uribe, an 18th century Spanish geographer and historian.
