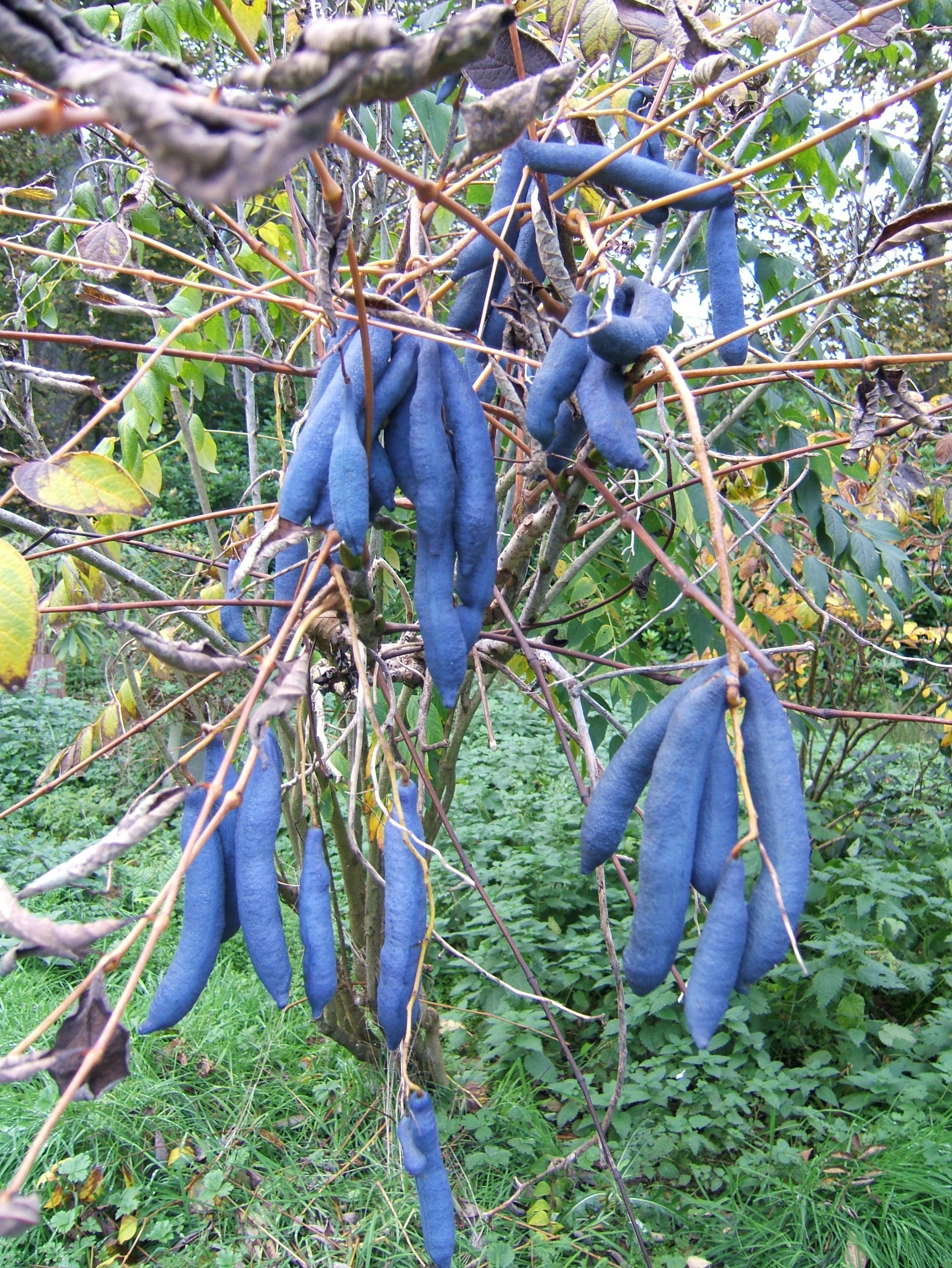
- Decaisnea fargesii

Scientific classification
- Kingdom: Plantae
- Clade: Embryophytes
- Clade: Tracheophytes
- Clade: Spermatophytes
- Clade: Angiosperms
- Clade: Eudicots
- Order: Ranunculales
- Family: Lardizabalaceae
- Genus: Decaisnea; Hook.f. & Thomson

Species
- Decaisnea fargesii Decaisnea insignis
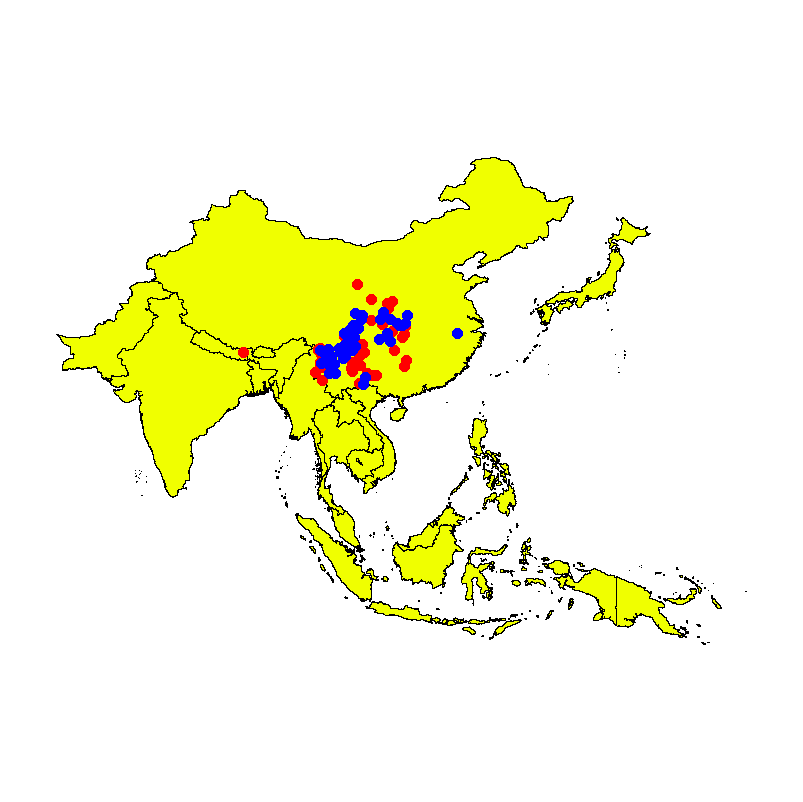
- Occurrence data from GBIF

= Decaisnea =

Genus of fruit-bearing shrubs

Decaisnea Lindl. is a synonym of Tropidia (plant), an orchid genus.

Decaisnea Hook.f &Thomson, (猫儿屎属 māo er shǐ shǔ) known commonly as dead man's fingers, blue bean plant, or blue sausage fruit, is a genus of flowering plants in the family Lardizabalaceae. It is native to eastern Asia, from China west to Nepal and south to Myanmar.

The genus consists of one or two species, depending on taxonomic opinion. Decaisnea insignis (Griffith) Hook.f. & Thomson was described from Nepal, and is sometimes restricted to the plants occurring in the Himalaya, with Chinese plants distinguished as Decaisnea fargesii Franchet. The only cited distinction between the plants from the two regions is the fruit colour, yellow-green in D. insignis and bluish in D. fargesii. This is of little significance and the two are now combined under the older name D. insignis by some authors.

Decaisnea species are deciduous shrubs or small trees growing to 5 to 8 m tall with trunks up to 20 cm in diameter. The leaves are pinnate, 60 to 90 cm long, with up to 25 leaflets each up to 15 cm long and 10 cm broad. The flowers are produced in drooping panicles 25 to 50 cm long. Each flower is 3 to 6 cm wide with greenish-yellow sepals and no petals. The fruit is a soft greenish-yellow to blue-black pod-like follicle up to 10 cm long and 3 cm diameter. It contains a transparent, glutinous, jelly-like pulp containing numerous (around 40) flat black seeds about 1 cm wide. The pulp is edible, but the seeds are not. The flavor of D. fargesii fruit pulp has been described as sweet and similar to watermelon, and the texture described as "gelatinous". D. insignis fruit has been described as "bland" and jelly-like.

== Cultivation and uses ==
Decaisnea is grown as an ornamental plant for its foliage and decorative fruit, bright blue in many cultivated specimens. Most plants in cultivation derive from Chinese seeds and are commonly grown under the name D. fargesii. The plants are successfully grown in cooler temperate climates, and in fertile, well-drained soil. They are tolerant of temperatures as low as −15 °C (5 °F).

The fruit is valued for eating by the Lepcha people of Sikkim.

== Gallery ==
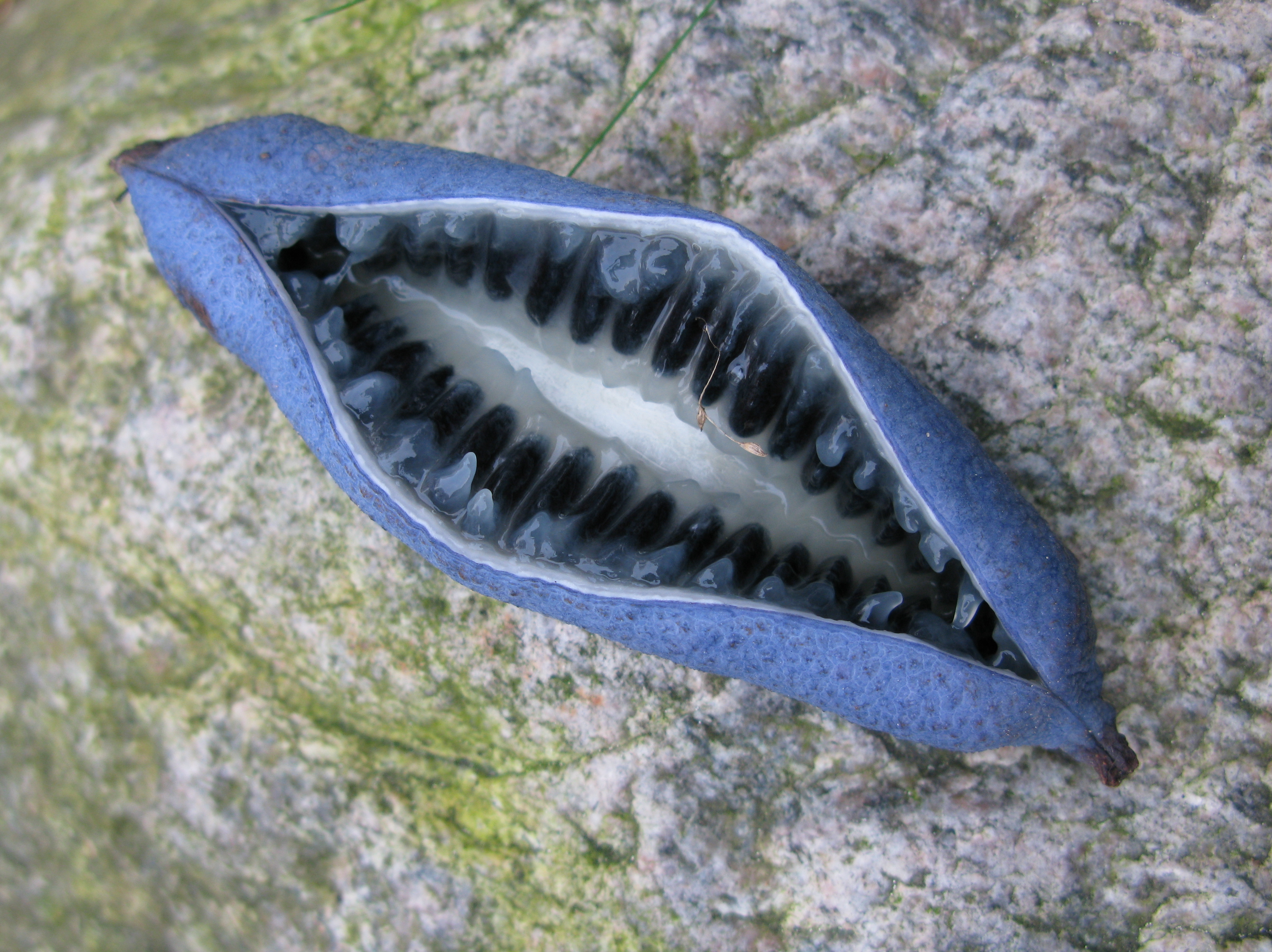
Internal flesh of the fruit

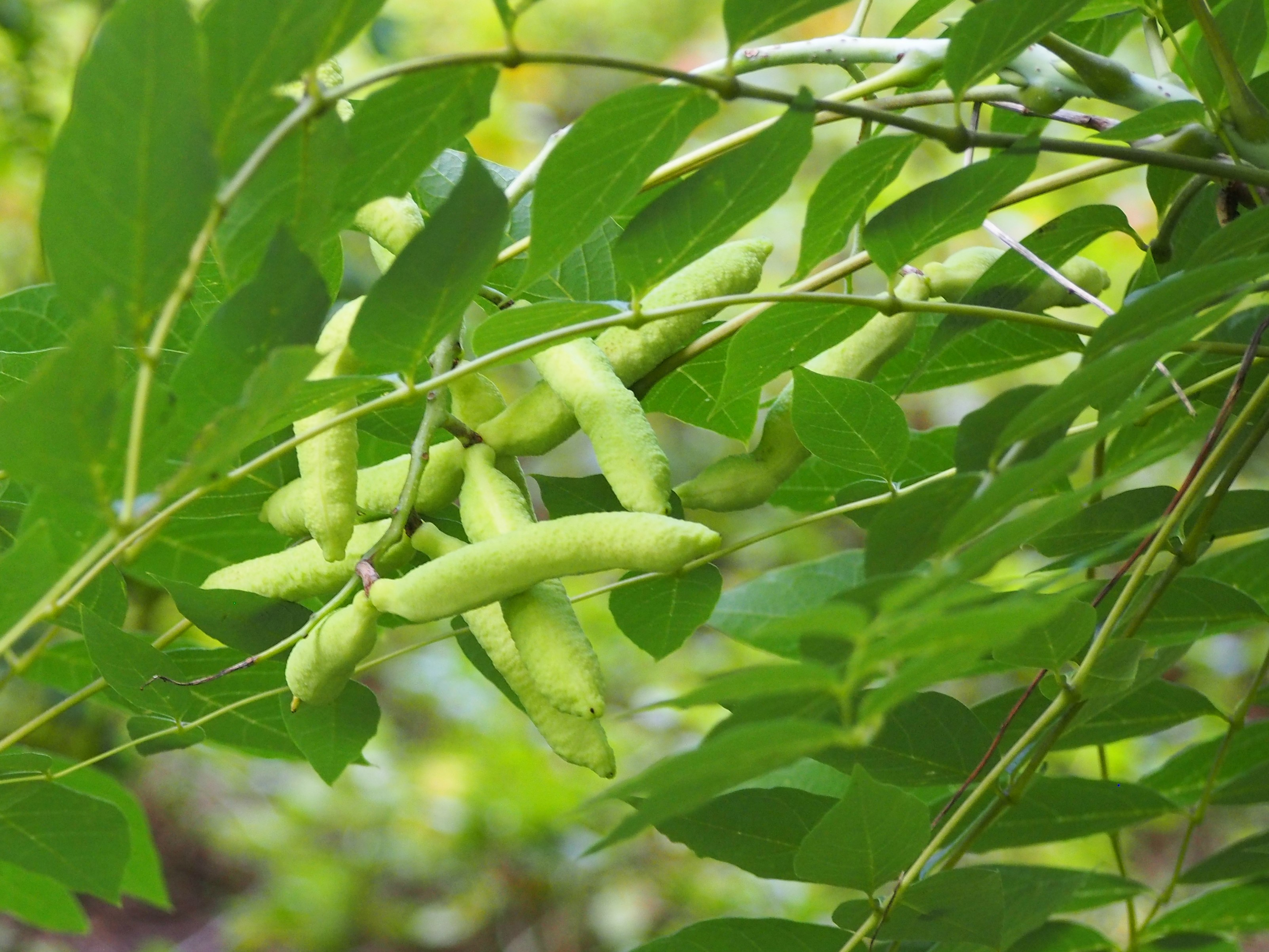
Unripe fruit

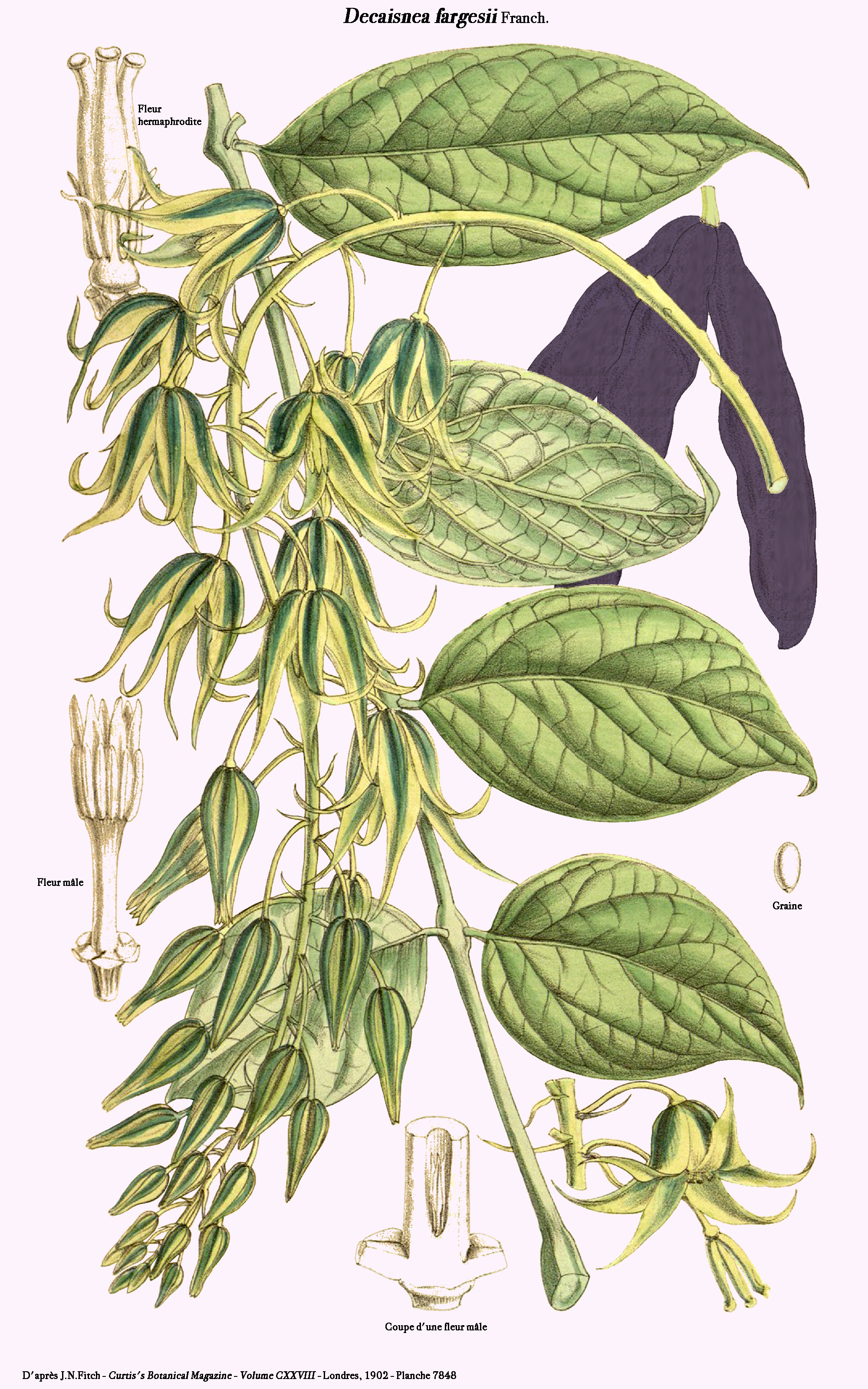
Botanical Illustration

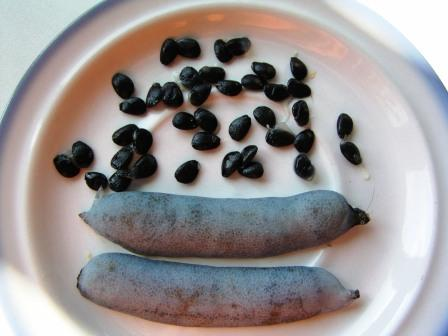
Seed size comparison to fruiting body
