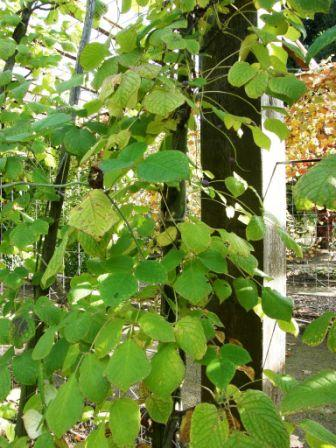
- Sinofranchetia chinensis

Scientific classification
- Kingdom: Plantae
- Clade: Tracheophytes
- Clade: Angiosperms
- Clade: Eudicots
- Order: Ranunculales
- Family: Lardizabalaceae
- Genus: Sinofranchetia; Hemsl.
- Species: S. chinensis

Binomial name
- Sinofranchetia chinensis (Franch.) Hemsl.

= Sinofranchetia =

Genus of flowering plants

Sinofranchetia is a genus of flowering plant in the Lardizabalaceae family. It contains a single species, Sinofranchetia chinensis, endemic to China.

== Description and ecology ==
Sinofranchetia chinensis is a deciduous, woody climber. It occurs in dense forests along valleys, forest margins, among shrubs in south-central China.
