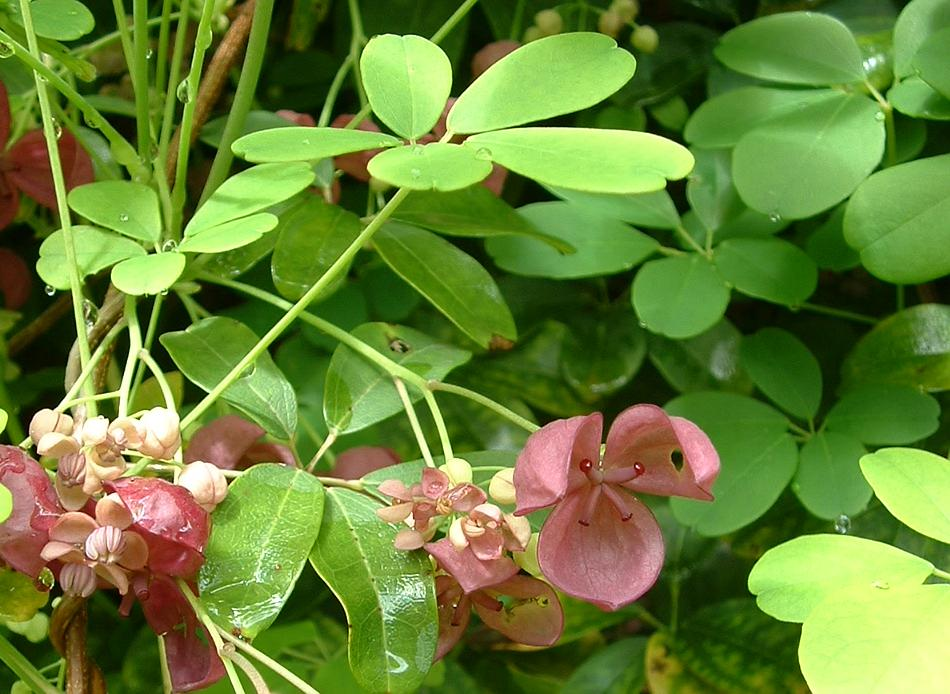
- Akebia quinata

Scientific classification
- Kingdom: Plantae
- Clade: Tracheophytes
- Clade: Angiosperms
- Clade: Eudicots
- Order: Ranunculales
- Family: Lardizabalaceae; R.Br.

Genera
- See text

Synonyms
- Decaisneaceae; Sargentodoxaceae; Sinofranchetiaceae.

= Lardizabalaceae =

Lardizabalaceae Temporal range: 120–0 Ma Early Cretaceous–Recent

Family of flowering plants

Lardizabalaceae is a family of flowering plants.

The family has been universally recognized by taxonomists, including the APG II system (2003; unchanged from the APG system of 1998), which places it in the order Ranunculales, in the clade eudicots.

The family consist of 7 genera with about 40 known species of woody plants. All are lianas, save Decaisnea, which are pachycaul shrubs. The leaves are alternate, and compound (usually palmate), with pulvinate leaflets. The flowers are often in drooping racemes.

They are found in eastern Asia, from the Himalayas to Japan, with the exception of the genera Lardizabala and Boquila, both native to southern South America (Chile, and Boquila also in adjacent western Argentina). The extinct genus Kajanthus is known from the Early Cretaceous of Portugal.

== Genera ==
| Image | Genus | Common name | Number of living species |
|---|---|---|---|
| | Akebia Decne. | Chocolate vine | 5 |
| | Boquila Decne. | Chameleon vine | 1 |
| | Decaisnea Hook.f. & Thomson | Dead man's fingers | 1 |
| | Lardizabala Ruiz & Pav. | Zabala fruit | 1 |
| | Sargentodoxa Rehder & E.H.Wilson | | 1 |
| | Sinofranchetia Hemsl. | | 1 |
| | Stauntonia DC. | | 16 |
