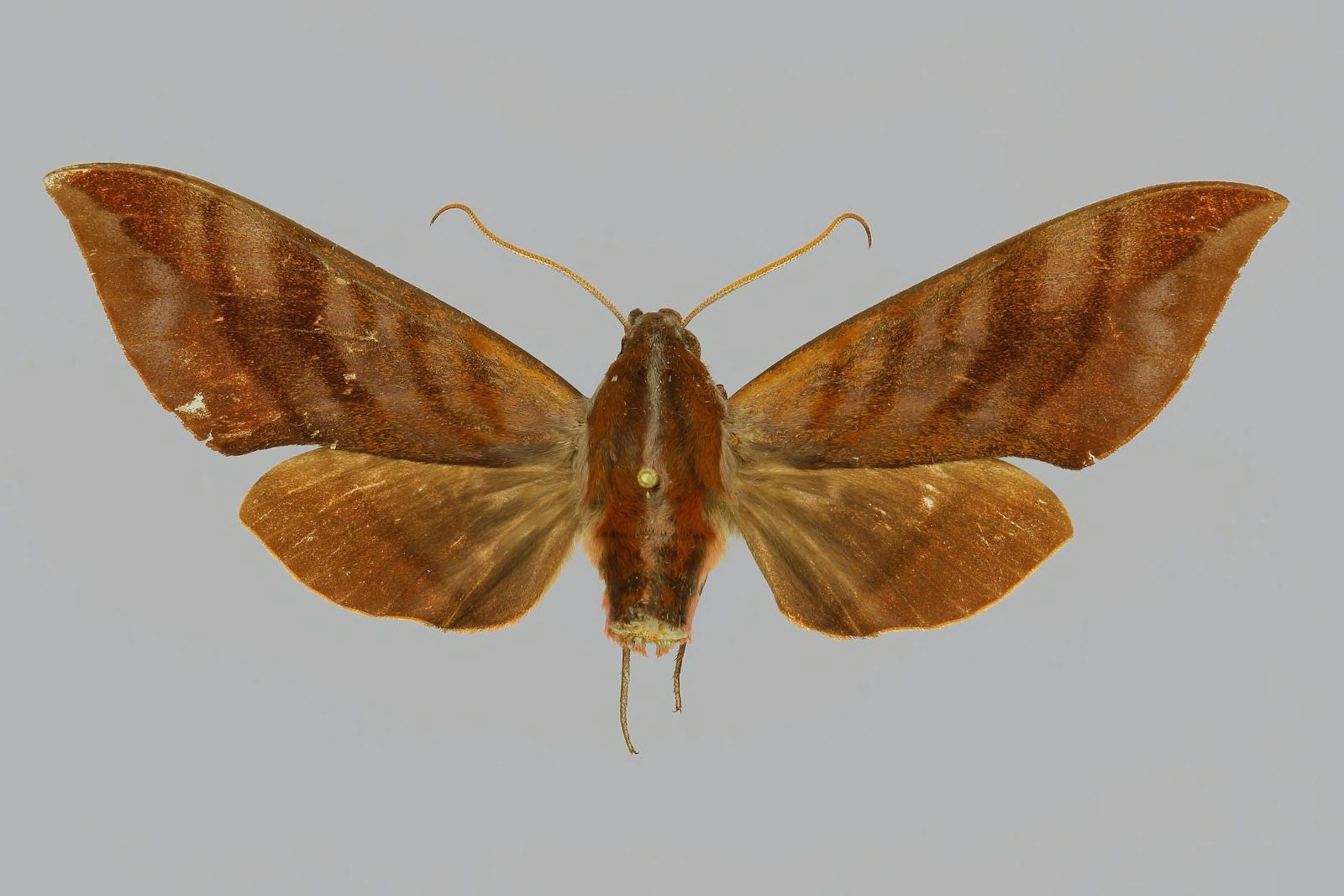

Scientific classification
- Kingdom: Animalia
- Phylum: Arthropoda
- Clade: Pancrustacea
- Class: Insecta
- Order: Lepidoptera
- Family: Sphingidae
- Genus: Ampelophaga
- Species: A. thomasi

Binomial name
- Ampelophaga thomasi Kitching & Cadiou, 1998

= Ampelophaga thomasi =

Species of moth

Ampelophaga thomasi is a moth of the family Sphingidae. It was discovered by Ian J. Kitching and Jean-Marie Cadiou in 1998. It is found in Nepal.
