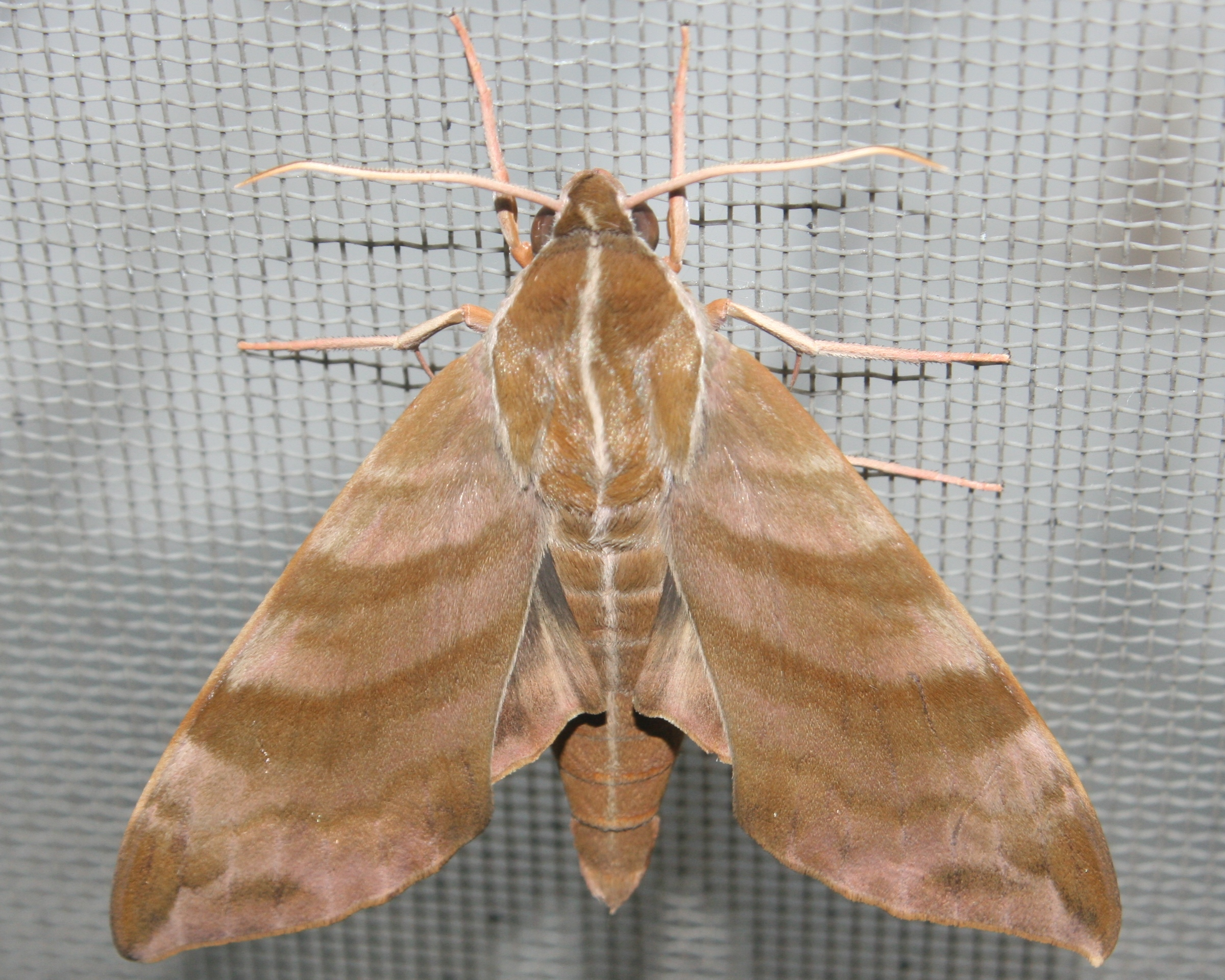

Scientific classification
- Domain: Eukaryota
- Kingdom: Animalia
- Phylum: Arthropoda
- Class: Insecta
- Order: Lepidoptera
- Family: Sphingidae
- Genus: Ampelophaga
- Species: A. rubiginosa

Binomial name
- Ampelophaga rubiginosa Bremer & Grey, 1853

Synonyms
- Ampelophaga romanovi (Staudinger, 1887); Deilephila romanovi Staudinger, 1887; Ampelophaga fasciosa Moore, 1888; Ampelophaga iyenobu Holland, 1889; Ampelophaga khasiana malayana Rothschild & Jordan, 1915; Ampelophaga alticola Mell, 1922; Ampelophaga hydrangeae Mell, 1922; Ampelophaga marginalis Matsumura, 1927; Ampelophaga submarginalis Matsumura, 1927

= Ampelophaga rubiginosa =

Species of moth

Ampelophaga rubiginosa is a moth of the family Sphingidae. It was described by Otto Vasilievich Bremer and William (Vasilii) Grey in 1853. It is found from north-eastern Afghanistan, east around the southern margin of the Himalaya to Yunnan, then throughout China to the Russian Far East, the Korean Peninsula and Japan. It is also found south through Thailand and Vietnam to Sumatra and Peninsular Malaysia.

== Description ==
The wingspan is 72–100 mm.

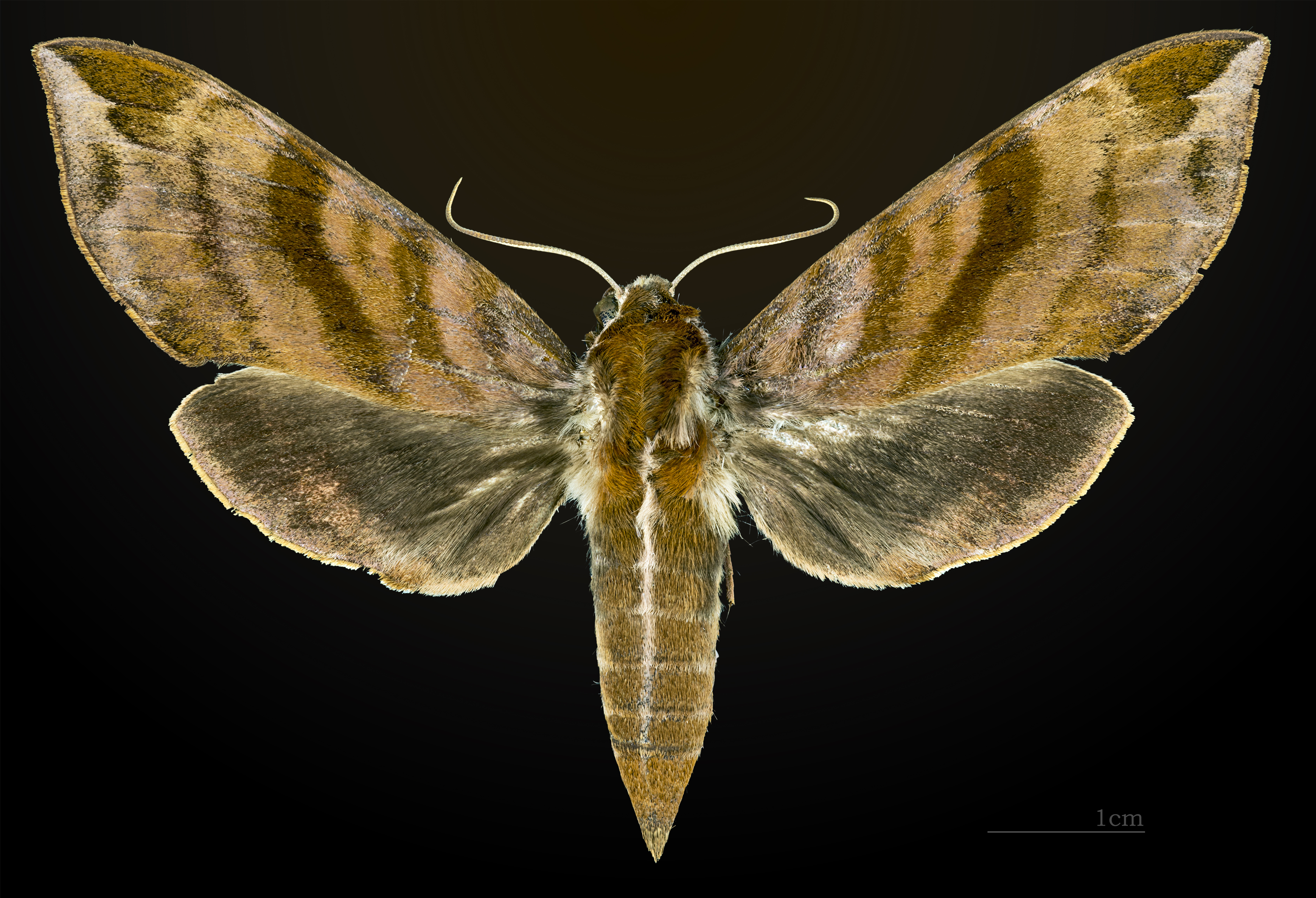
Female

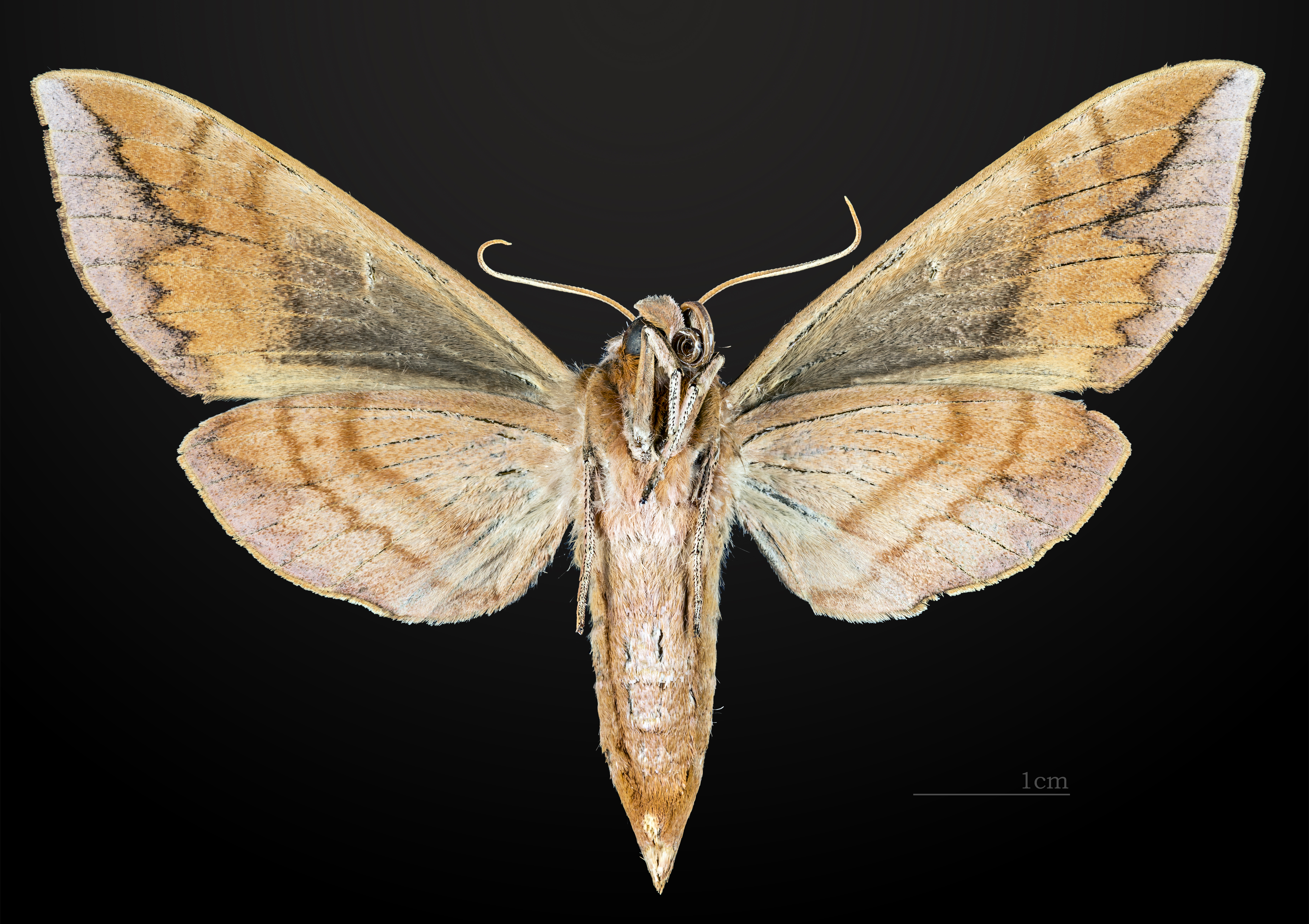
Female underside

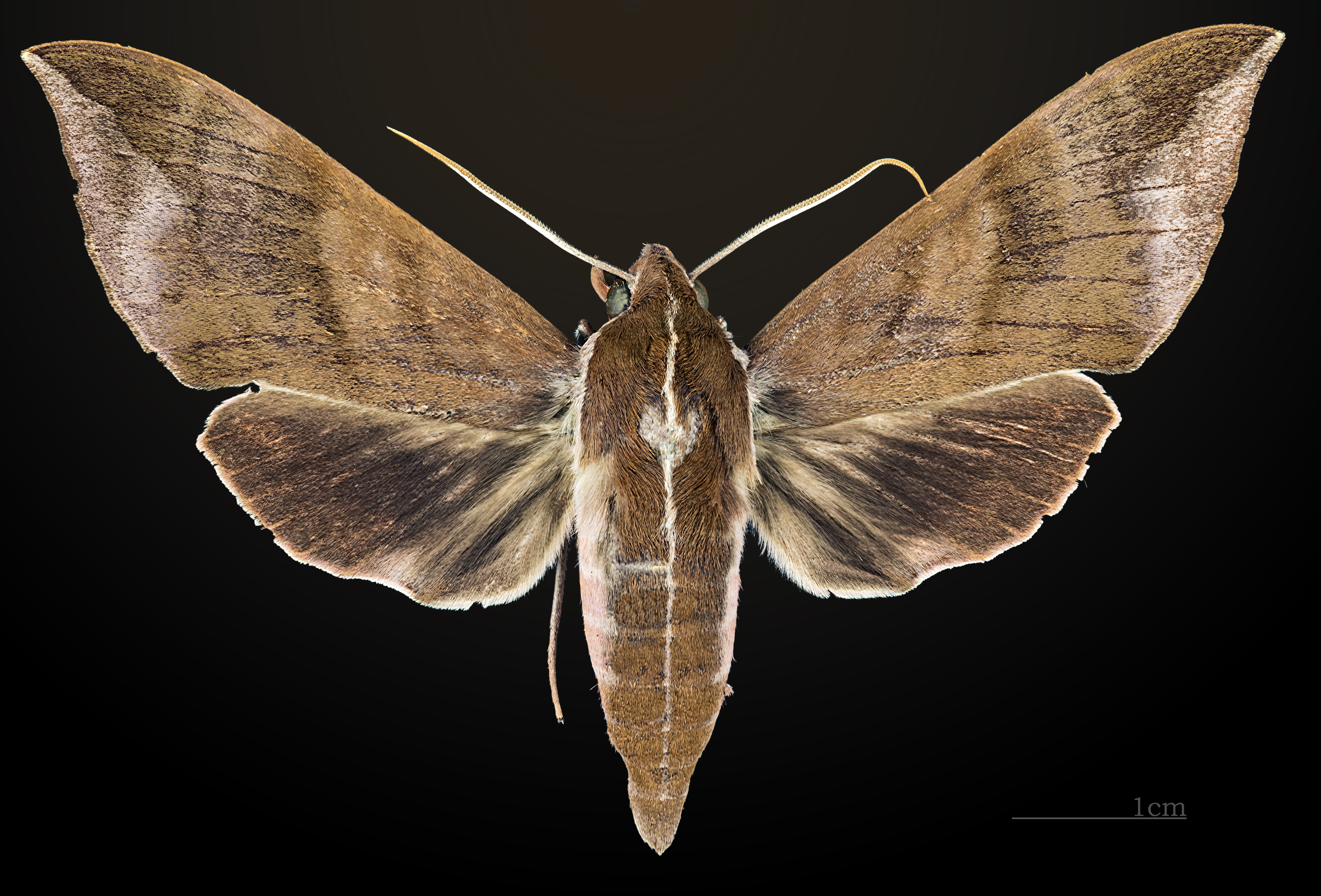
Male

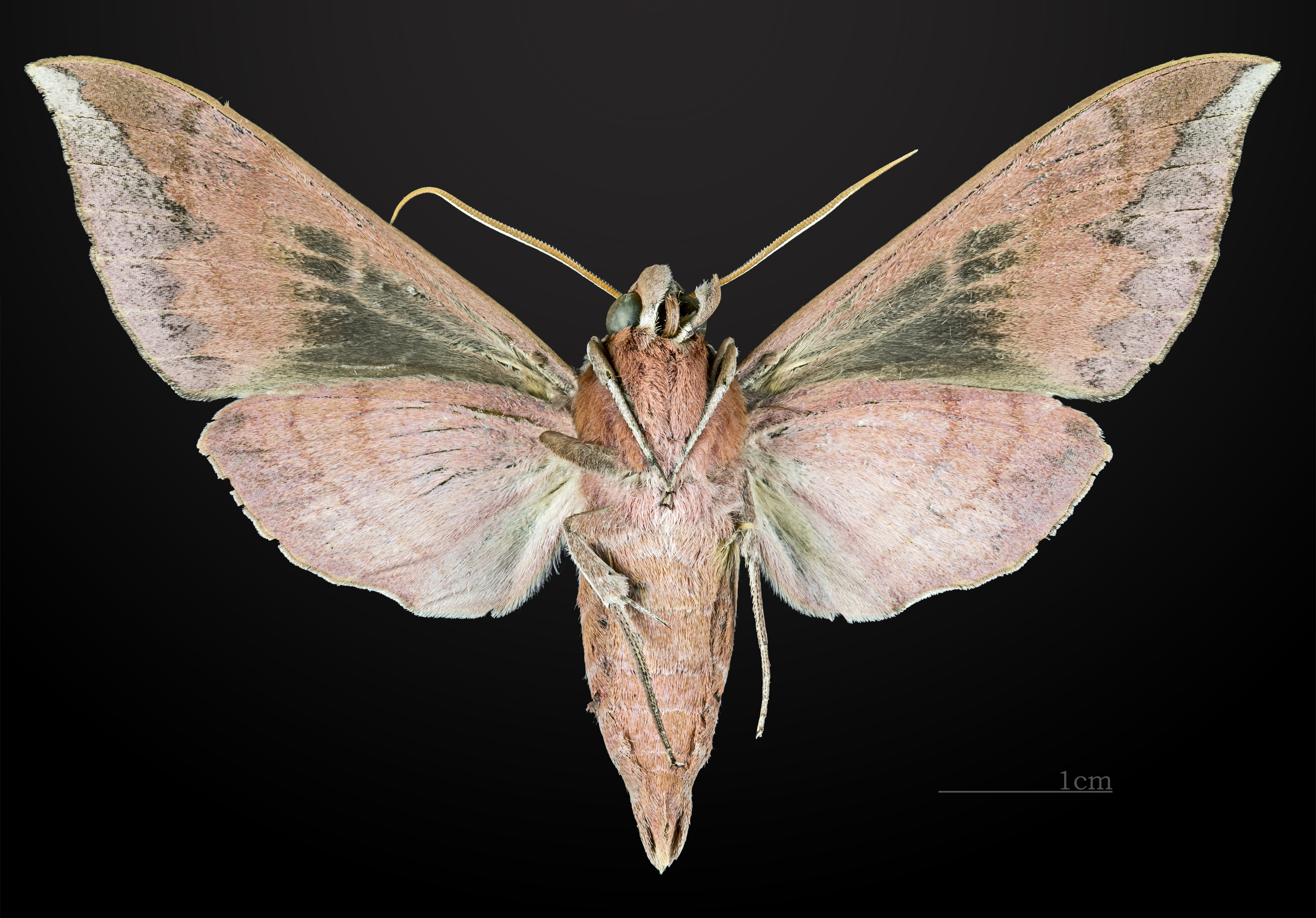
Male underside

== Biology ==
There is one generation per year in north-eastern China, with adults on wing from June to August. Further south, there may be up to three generations per year. In Shanghai, adults are on wing from February to October. In Korea, they are found from early May to early August.

Larvae have been recorded feeding on Vitaceae species (including Cayratia, Parthenocissus and Vitis), Hydrangea paniculata and Saurauia.

== Subspecies ==
- Ampelophaga rubiginosa rubiginosa
- Ampelophaga rubiginosa lohita Kishida & Yano, 2001 (Japan (Kyushu and the Ryukyu Archipelago))
- Ampelophaga rubiginosa myosotis Kitching & Cadiou, 2000 (Taiwan)

== Gallery ==
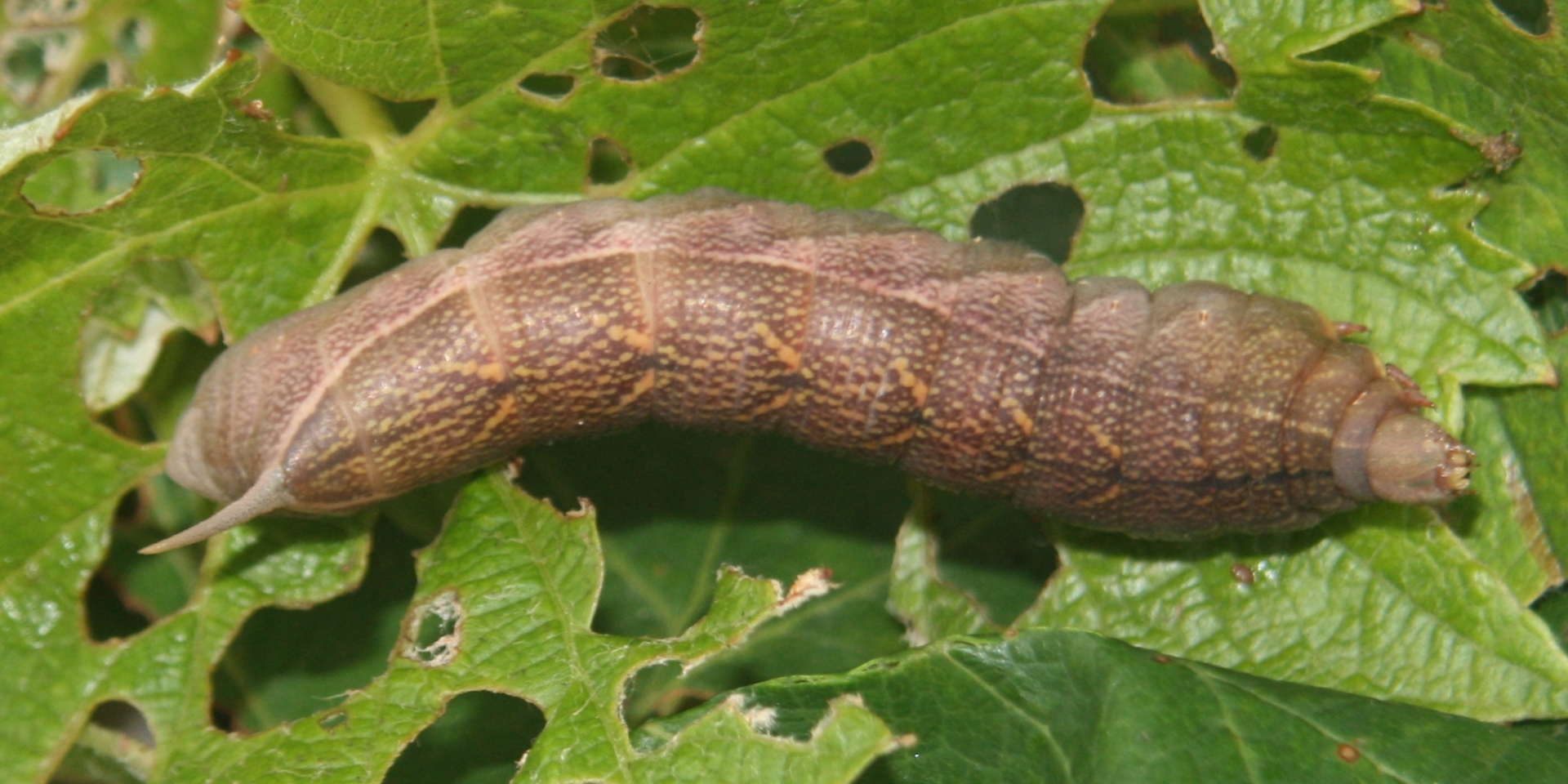
Larva

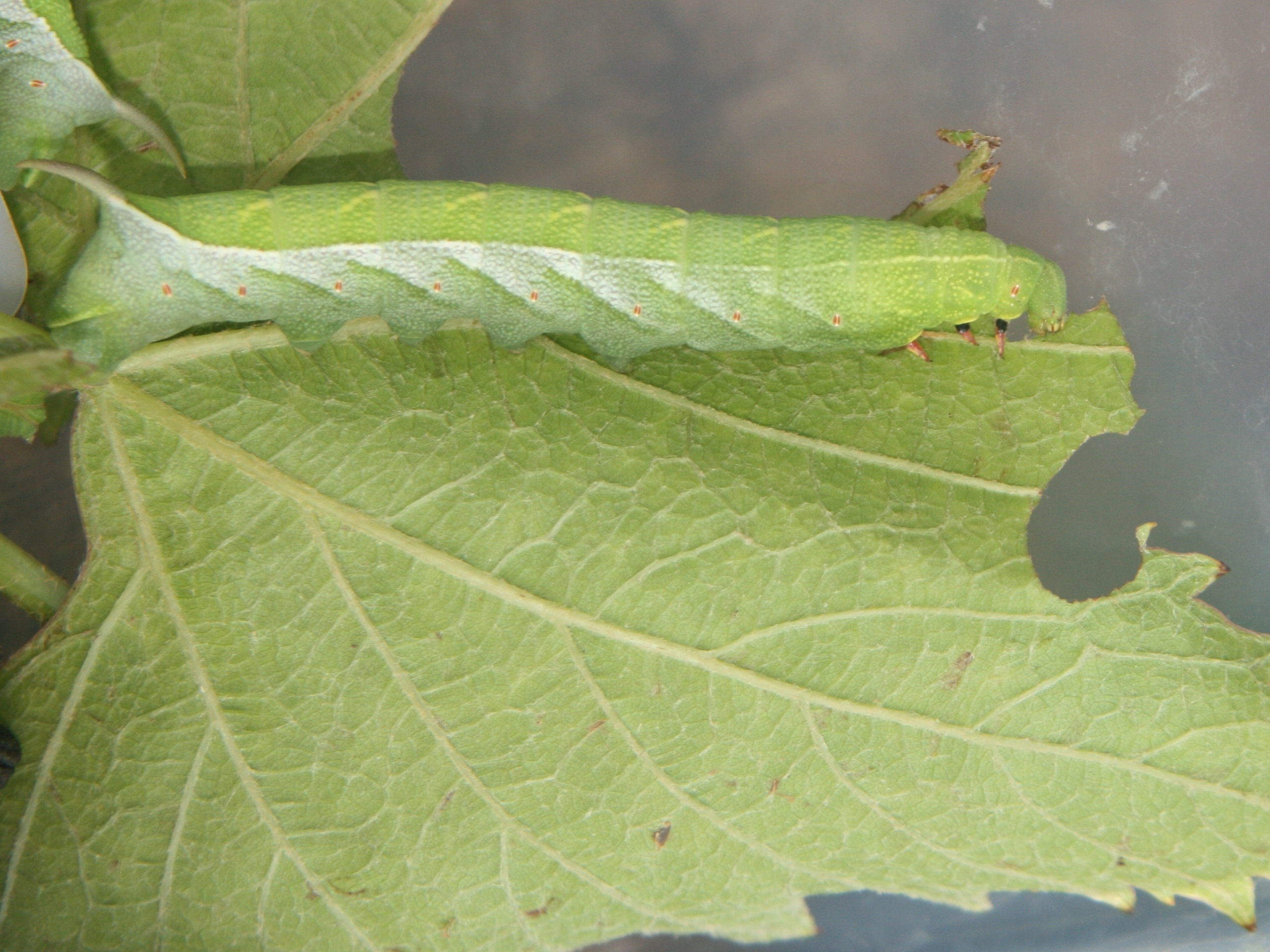
Damage

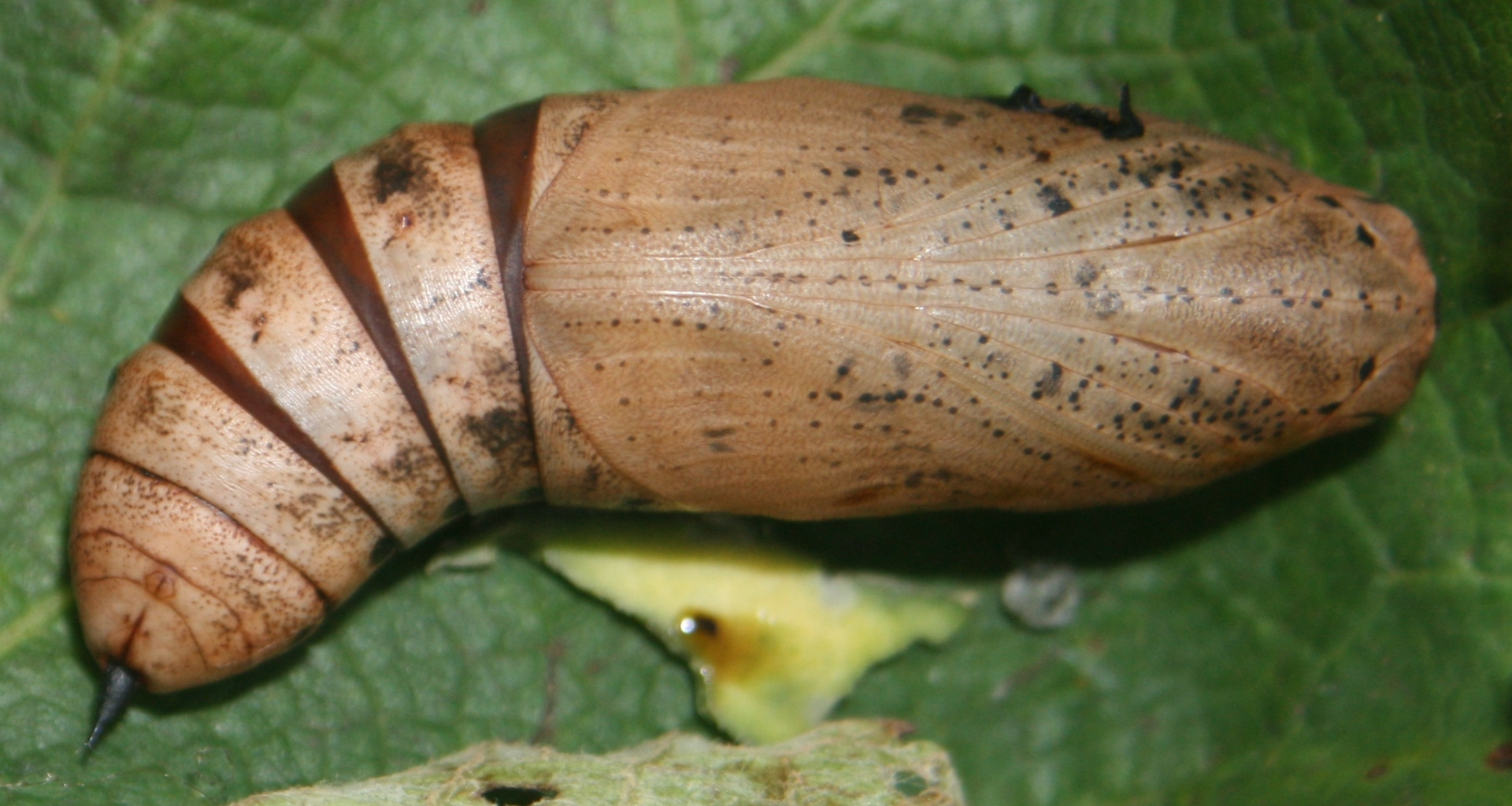
Pupa

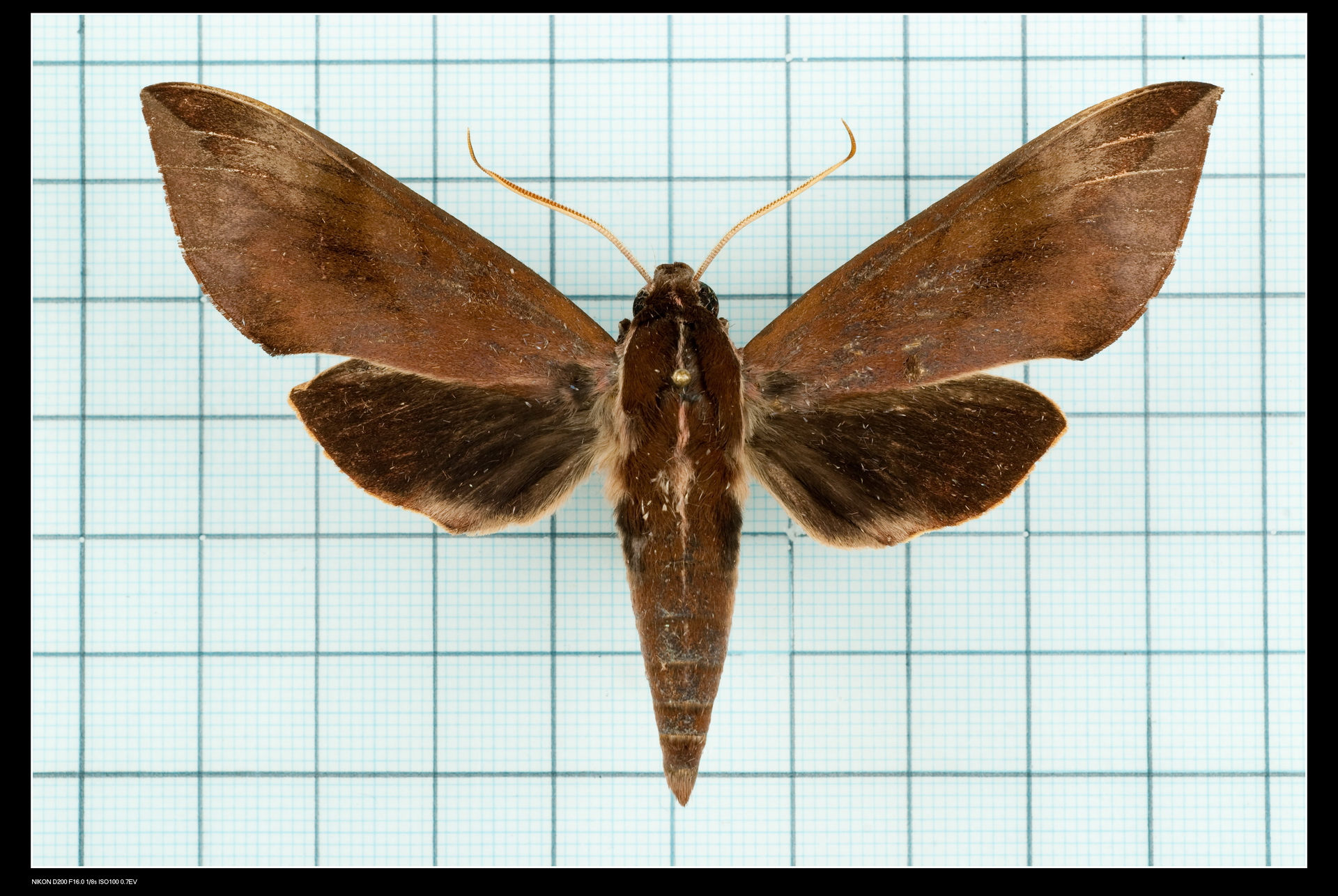
Ampelophaga rubiginosa myosotis
