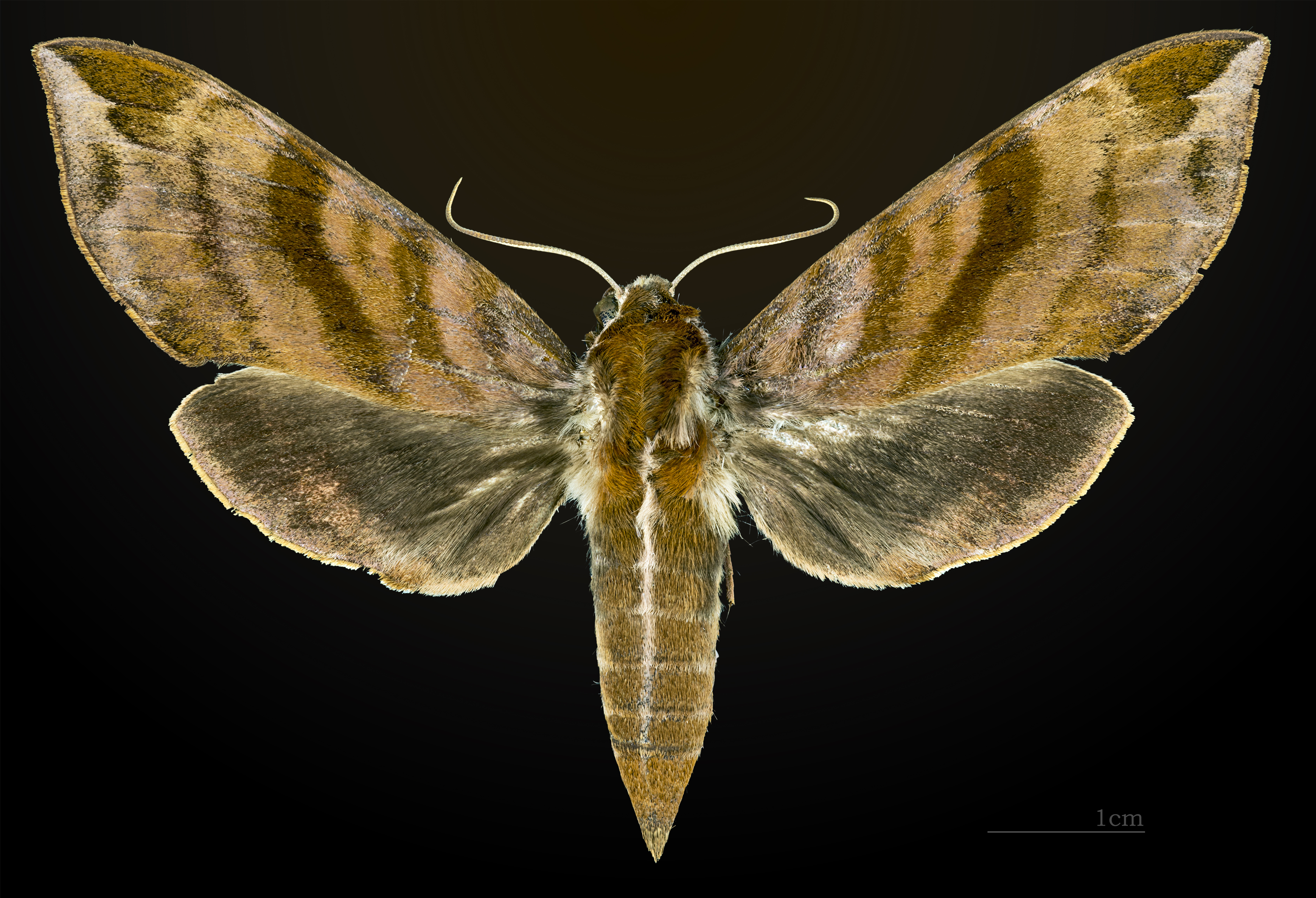
- Ampelophaga rubiginosa

Scientific classification
- Kingdom: Animalia
- Phylum: Arthropoda
- Class: Insecta
- Order: Lepidoptera
- Family: Sphingidae
- Subtribe: Macroglossina
- Genus: Ampelophaga; Bremer & Grey, 1853

Species
- See text

= Ampelophaga =

Genus of moths

Ampelophaga is a genus of moths in the family Sphingidae.

== Species ==
- Ampelophaga dolichoides – (R. Felder, 1874)
- Ampelophaga khasiana – Rothschild, 1895
- Ampelophaga nikolae – Haxaire & Melichar, 2007
- Ampelophaga rubiginosa – Bremer & Grey, 1853
- Ampelophaga thomasi – Cadiou & Kitching, 1998
