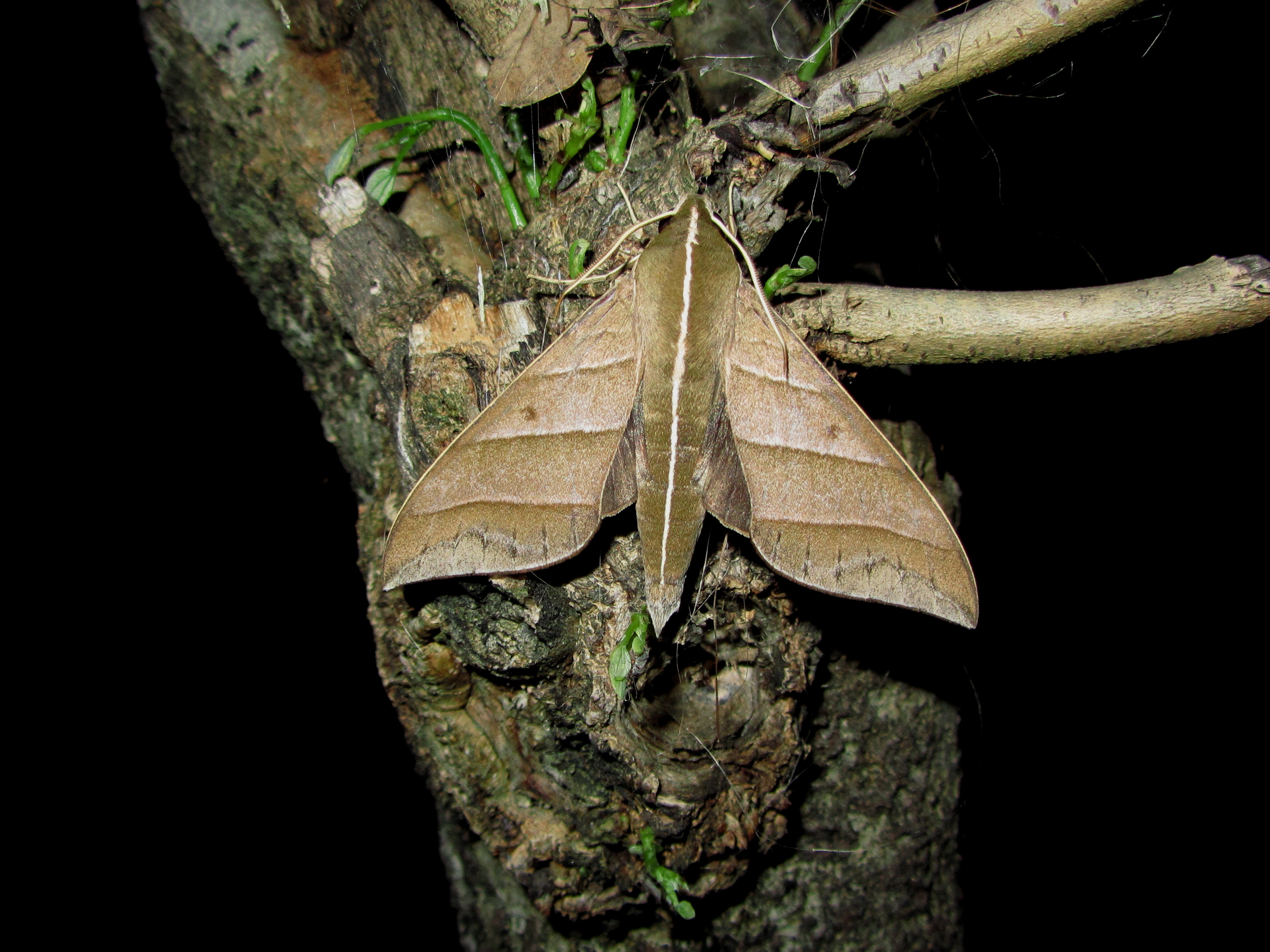

Scientific classification
- Domain: Eukaryota
- Kingdom: Animalia
- Phylum: Arthropoda
- Class: Insecta
- Order: Lepidoptera
- Family: Sphingidae
- Genus: Ampelophaga
- Species: A. dolichoides

Binomial name
- Ampelophaga dolichoides (R. Felder, [1874])

Synonyms
- Philampelus dolichoides R. Felder, [1874]; Elibia dolichoides

= Ampelophaga dolichoides =

Species of moth

Ampelophaga dolichoides, the green banded hawkmoth, is a moth of the family Sphingidae. It was described by Rudolf Felder in 1874. It is found from Nepal and Sikkim, north-eastern India, across Thailand and south-western China to Selangor, Peninsular Malaysia.

The wingspan is 80–100 mm.

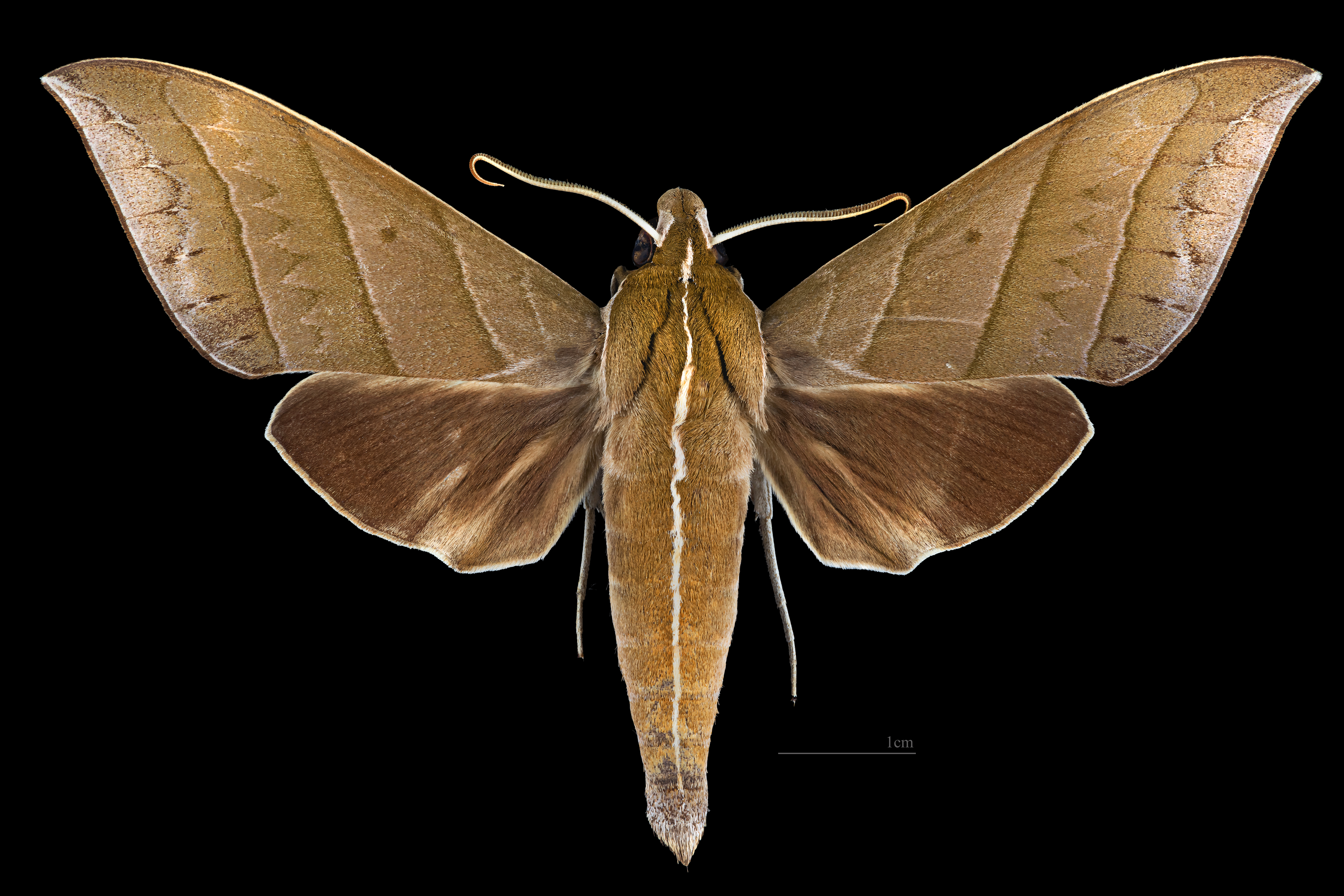
Male dorsal view

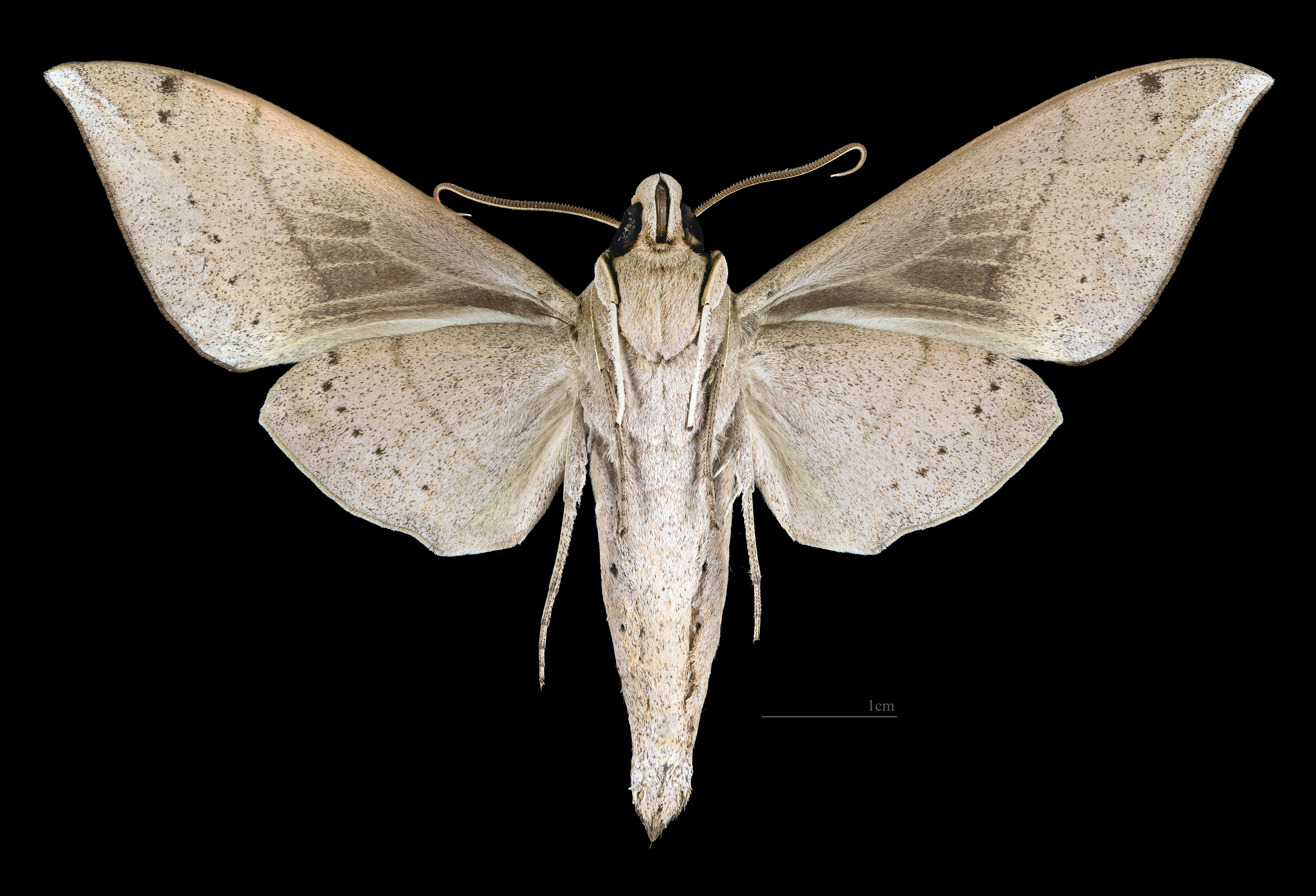
Male ventral view

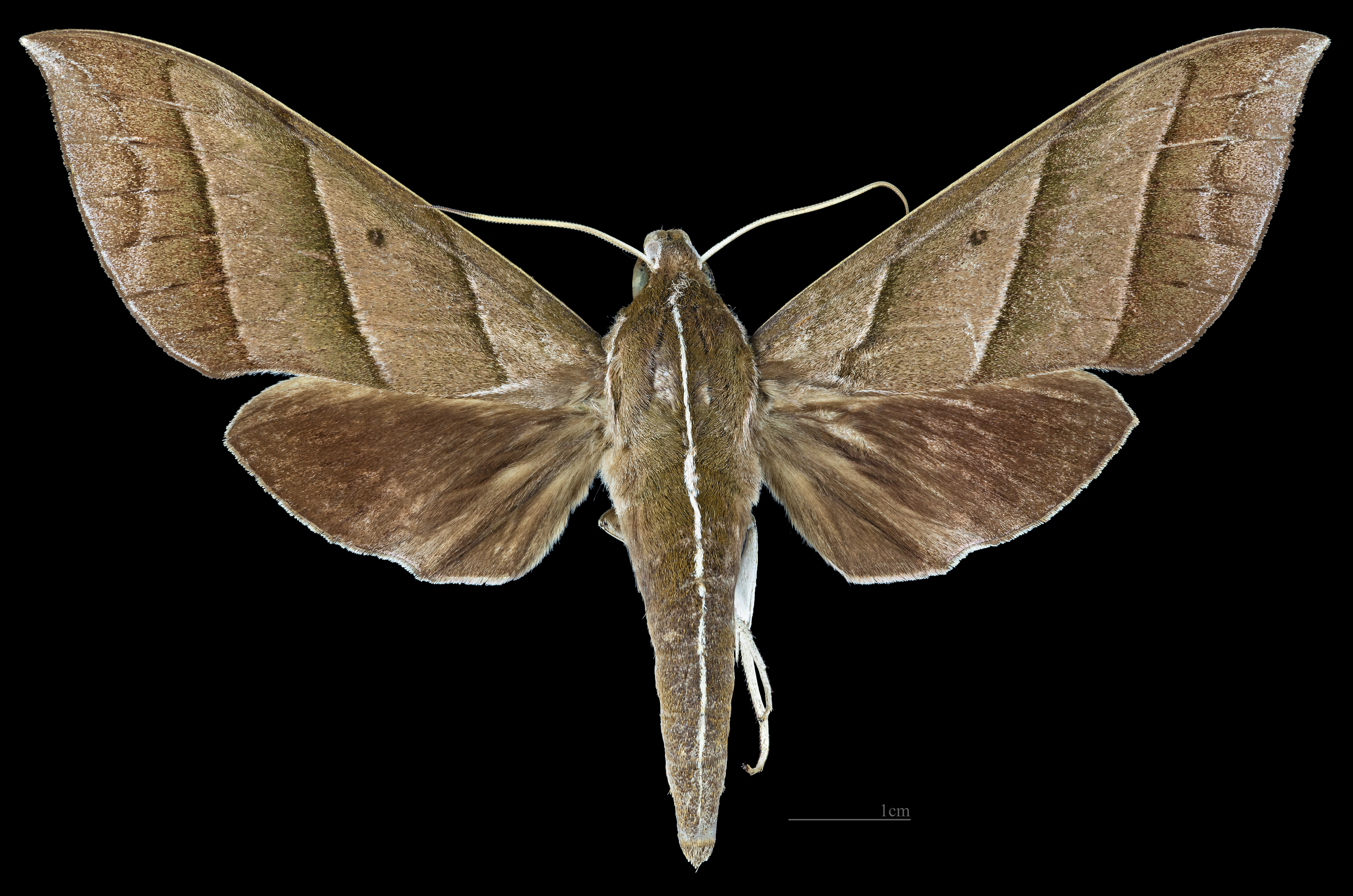
Female dorsal view

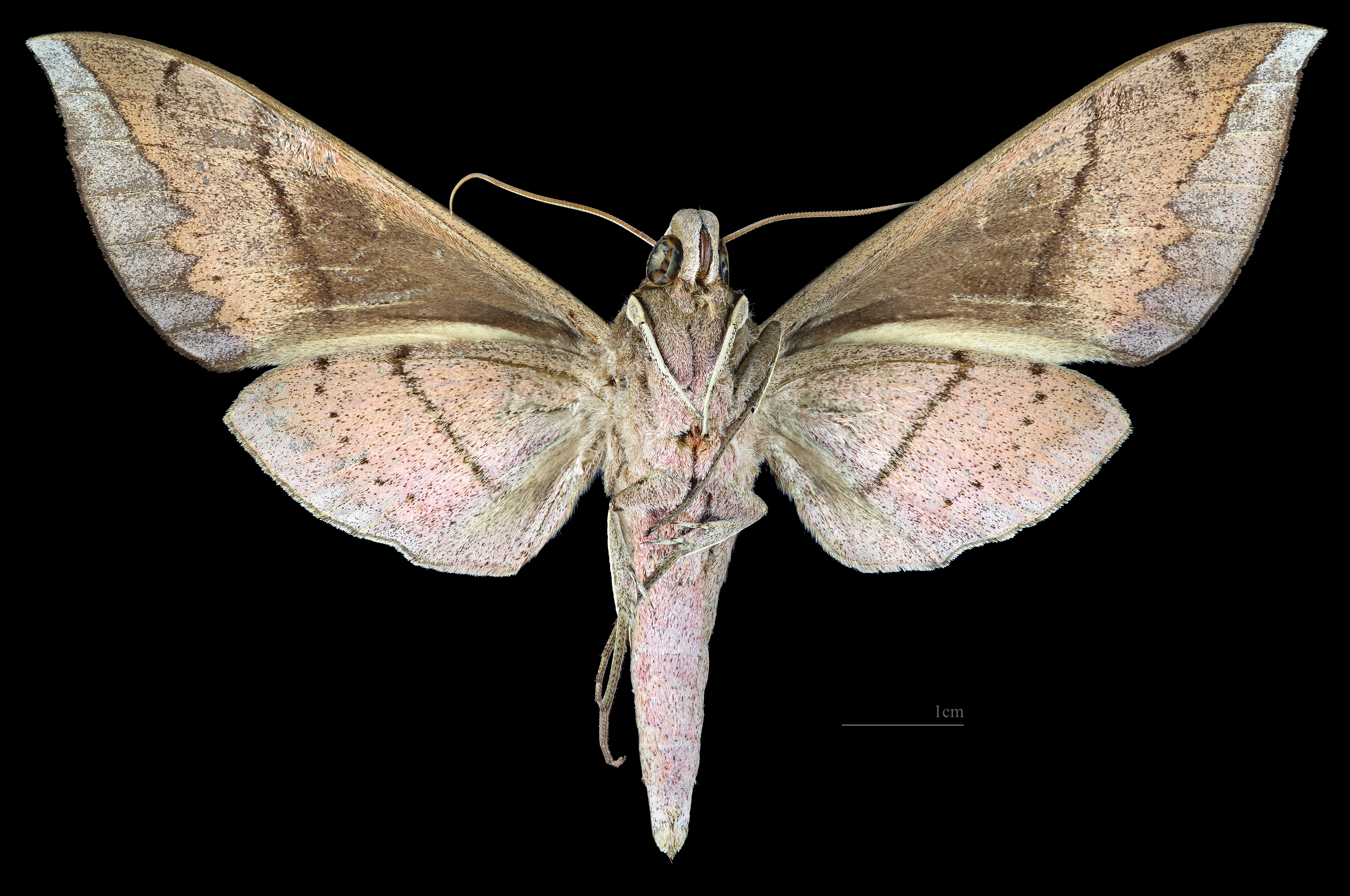
Female ventral view

The larvae feed on Vitaceae species, particularly the mature leaves. A larva found on Tetrastigma was reared on Parthenocissus inserta.
