= Ampelophaga nikolae =

Scientific classification
- Domain: Eukaryota
- Kingdom: Animalia
- Phylum: Arthropoda
- Class: Insecta
- Order: Lepidoptera
- Family: Sphingidae
- Genus: Ampelophaga
- Species: A. nikolae

Binomial name
- Ampelophaga nikolae Haxaire & Melichar, 2007

Species of moth

Ampelophaga nikolae is a moth of the family Sphingidae. It is known from the Jiangxi-Fujian border in China.
