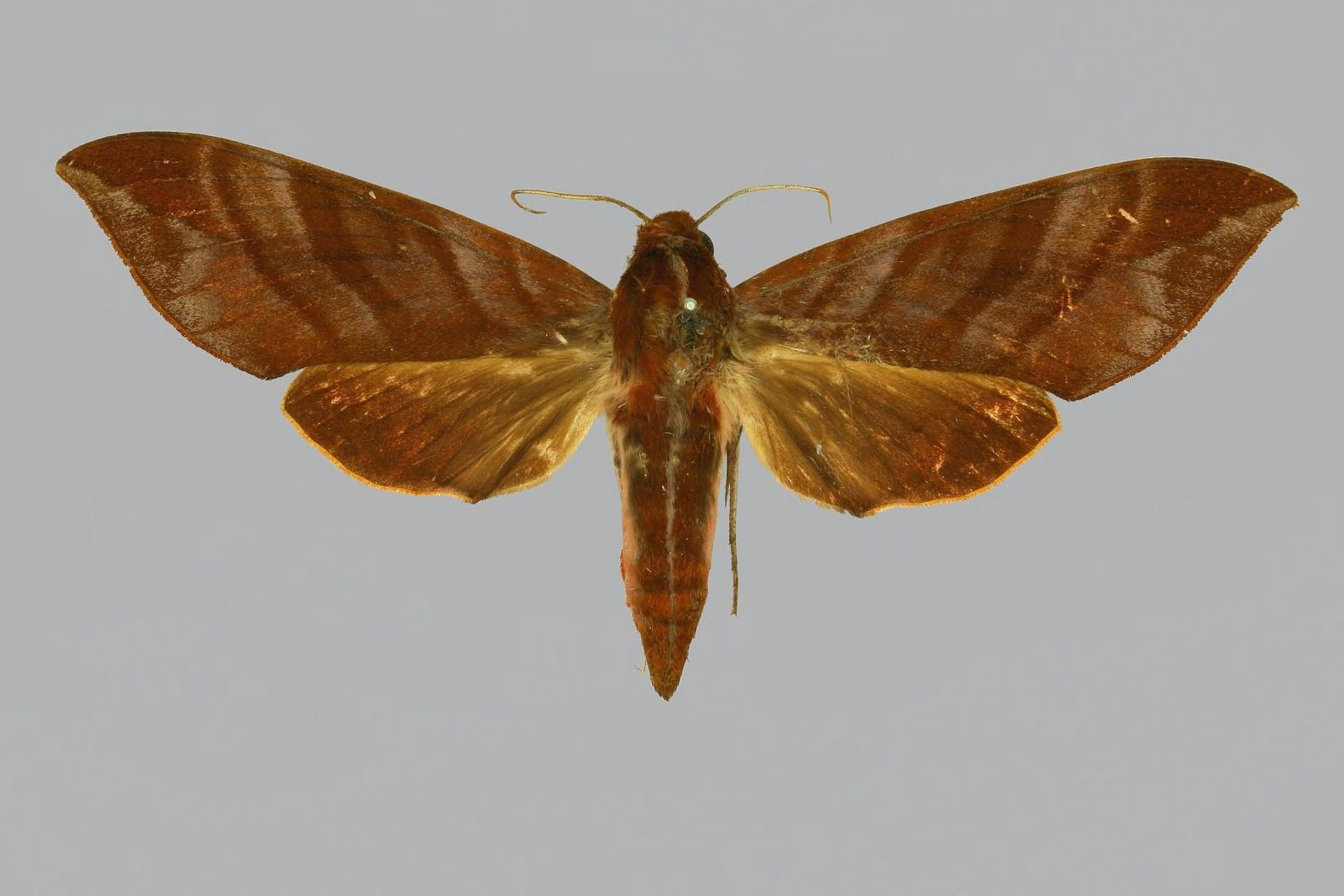

Scientific classification
- Domain: Eukaryota
- Kingdom: Animalia
- Phylum: Arthropoda
- Class: Insecta
- Order: Lepidoptera
- Family: Sphingidae
- Genus: Ampelophaga
- Species: A. khasiana

Binomial name
- Ampelophaga khasiana Rothschild, 1895

= Ampelophaga khasiana =

Species of moth

Ampelophaga khasiana, the scarce vine hawkmoth, is a moth of the family Sphingidae. It was described by Walter Rothschild in 1895. It is found from Nepal, Sikkim in north-eastern India and to central China.

The wingspan is 80–102 mm.

The larvae feed on Vitis species and Saurauia nepalensis in India.
