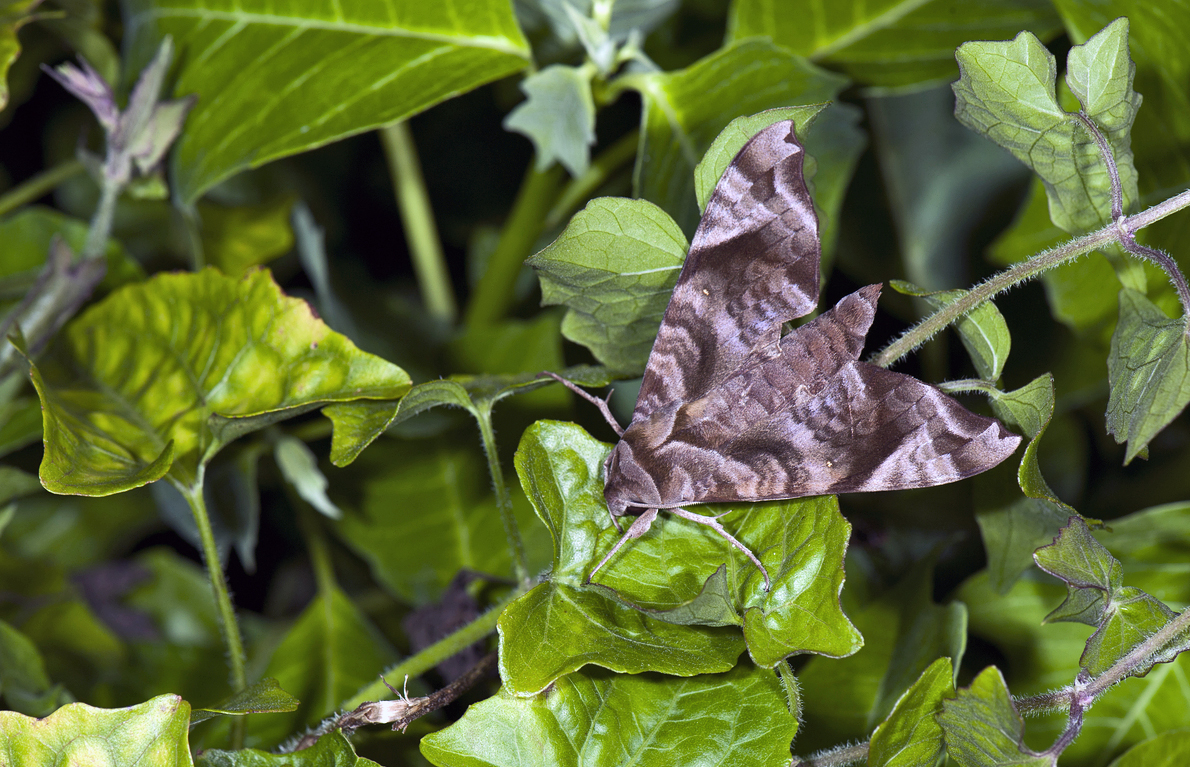

Scientific classification
- Domain: Eukaryota
- Kingdom: Animalia
- Phylum: Arthropoda
- Class: Insecta
- Order: Lepidoptera
- Family: Sphingidae
- Genus: Acosmeryx
- Species: A. castanea

Binomial name
- Acosmeryx castanea Rothschild & Jordan, 1903

Synonyms
- Acosmeryx castanea conspicua Mell, 1922; Acosmeryx castanea distincta Clark, 1928; Acosmeryx castanea kuangtungensis Mell, 1922

= Acosmeryx castanea =

Species of moth

Acosmeryx castanea is a moth of the family Sphingidae. It was described by Rothschild and Jordan in 1903.

== Distribution ==
Is known from eastern and southern China, Taiwan, South Korea and Japan.

== Description ==
The wingspan is 75–90 mm.

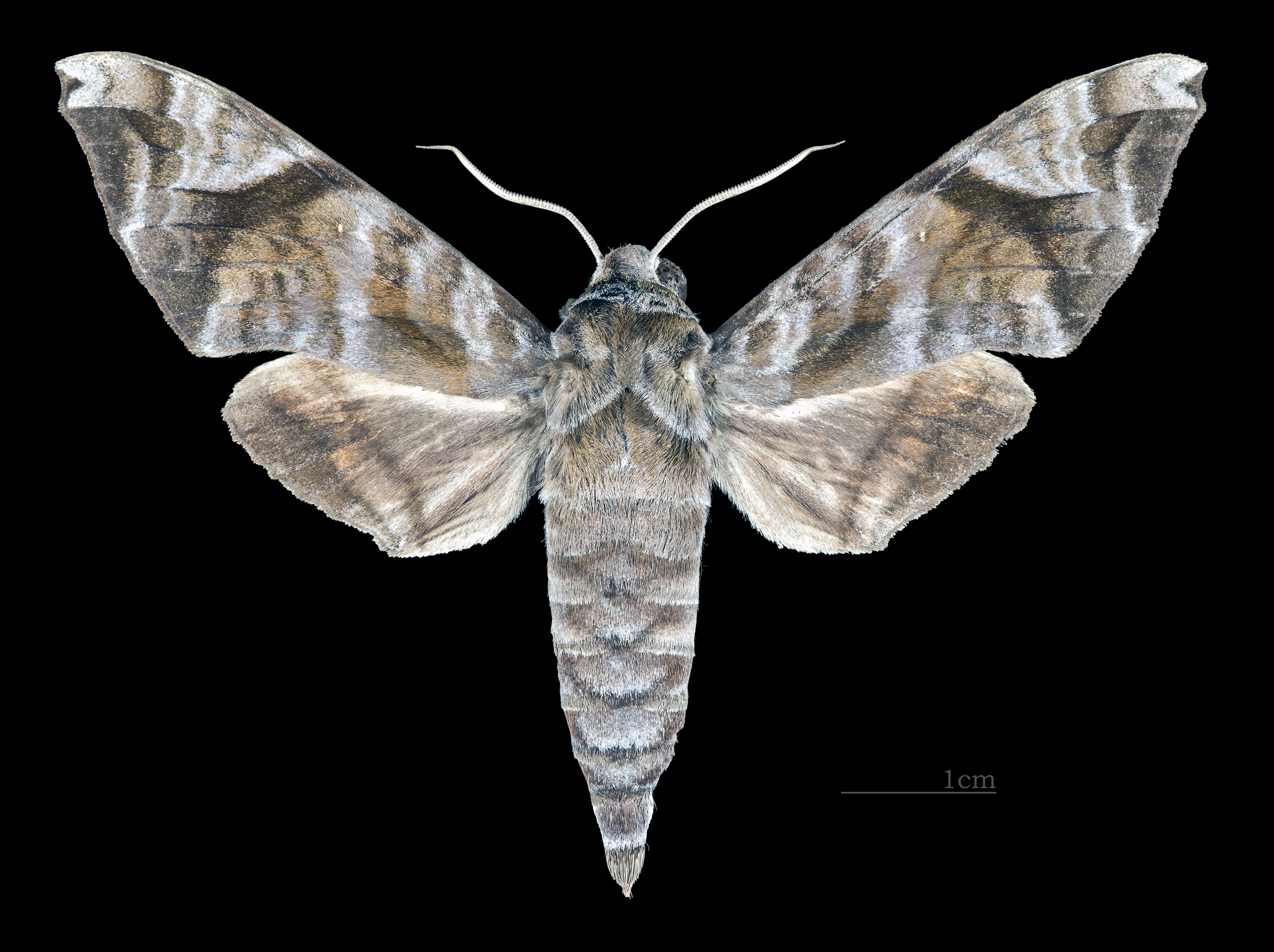
Male dorsal

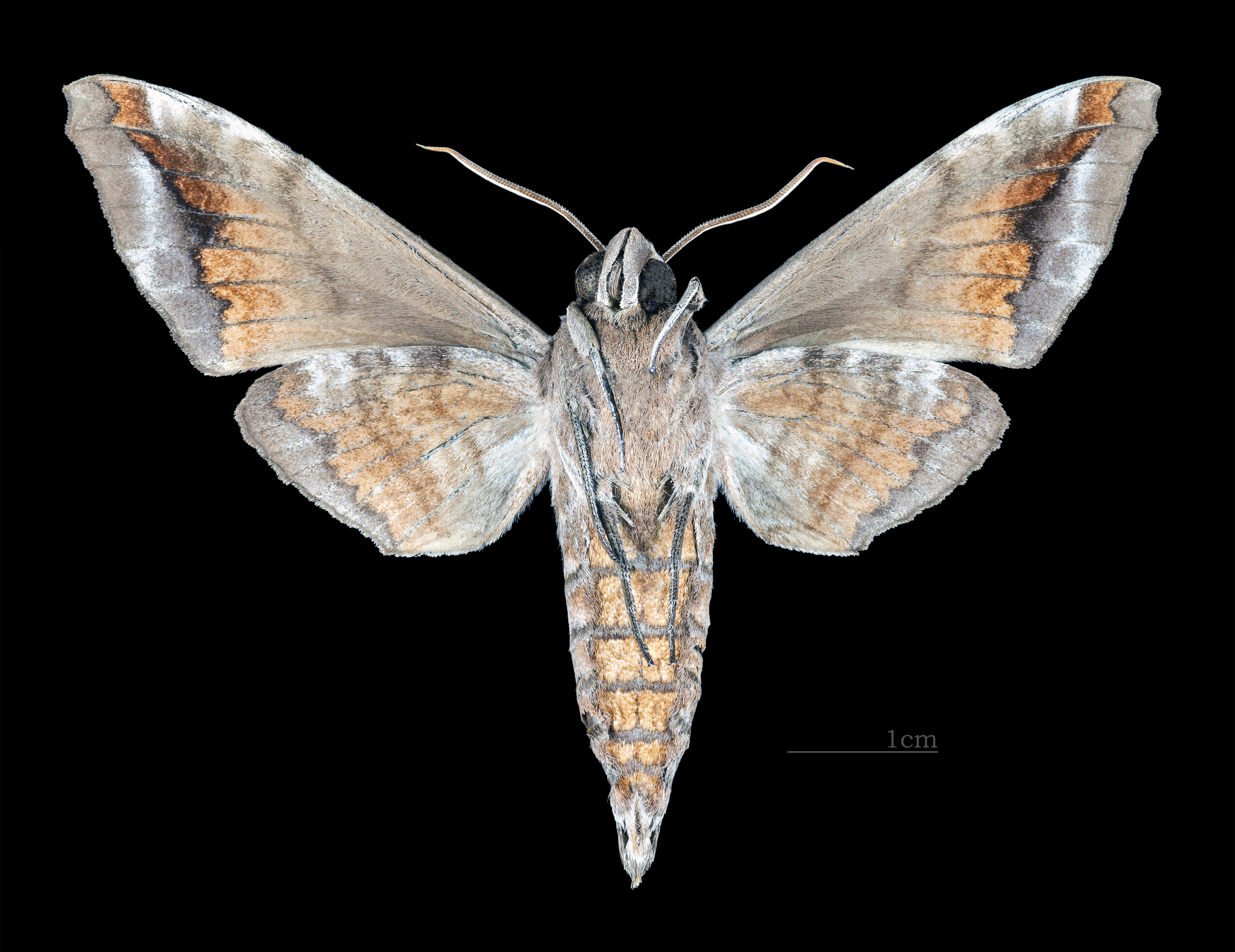
Male ventral

== Biology ==
In Hong Kong, adults are on wing from March to late September. In Korea and Japan, adults are on wing from late June to mid-August. There are multiple generations per year.

The larvae feed on Ampelopsis glandulosa and Cayratia japonica.
