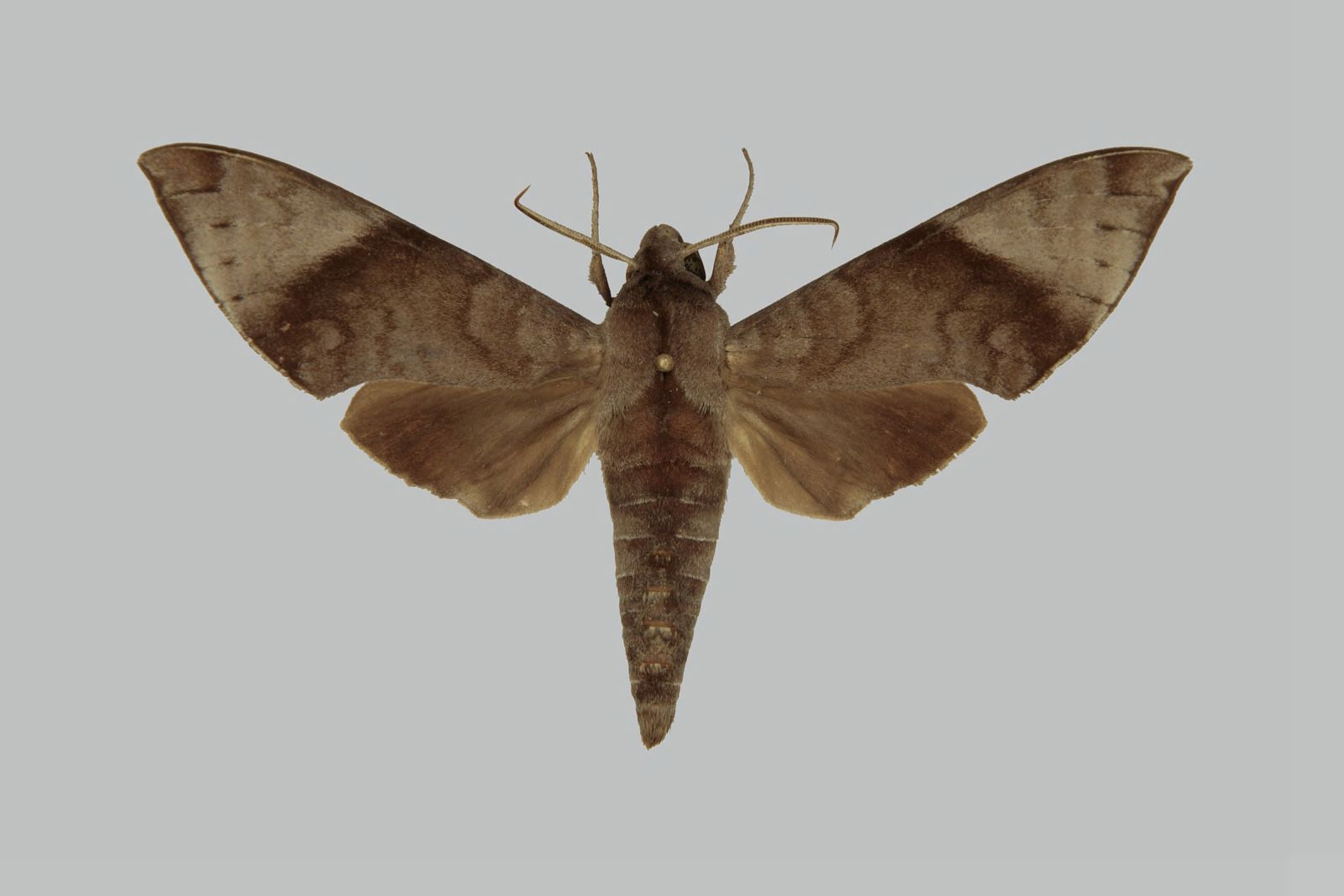
- Upperside of holotype (male)

Scientific classification
- Kingdom: Animalia
- Phylum: Arthropoda
- Clade: Pancrustacea
- Class: Insecta
- Order: Lepidoptera
- Family: Sphingidae
- Genus: Acosmeryx
- Species: A. sinjaevi

Binomial name
- Acosmeryx sinjaevi Brechlin & Kitching, 1996

= Acosmeryx sinjaevi =

Species of moth

Acosmeryx sinjaevi, the southern gliding hawkmoth, is a moth of the family Sphingidae. It was described by Ron Brechlin and Ian J. Kitching in 1996 and is known from northern Vietnam and Hainan and Fujian, China.
