= Acosmeryx miskinoides =

Scientific classification
- Domain: Eukaryota
- Kingdom: Animalia
- Phylum: Arthropoda
- Class: Insecta
- Order: Lepidoptera
- Family: Sphingidae
- Genus: Acosmeryx
- Species: A. miskinoides

Binomial name
- Acosmeryx miskinoides Vaglia & Haxaire, 2007

Species of moth

Acosmeryx miskinoides is a moth of the family Sphingidae. It is known from Papua New Guinea.
