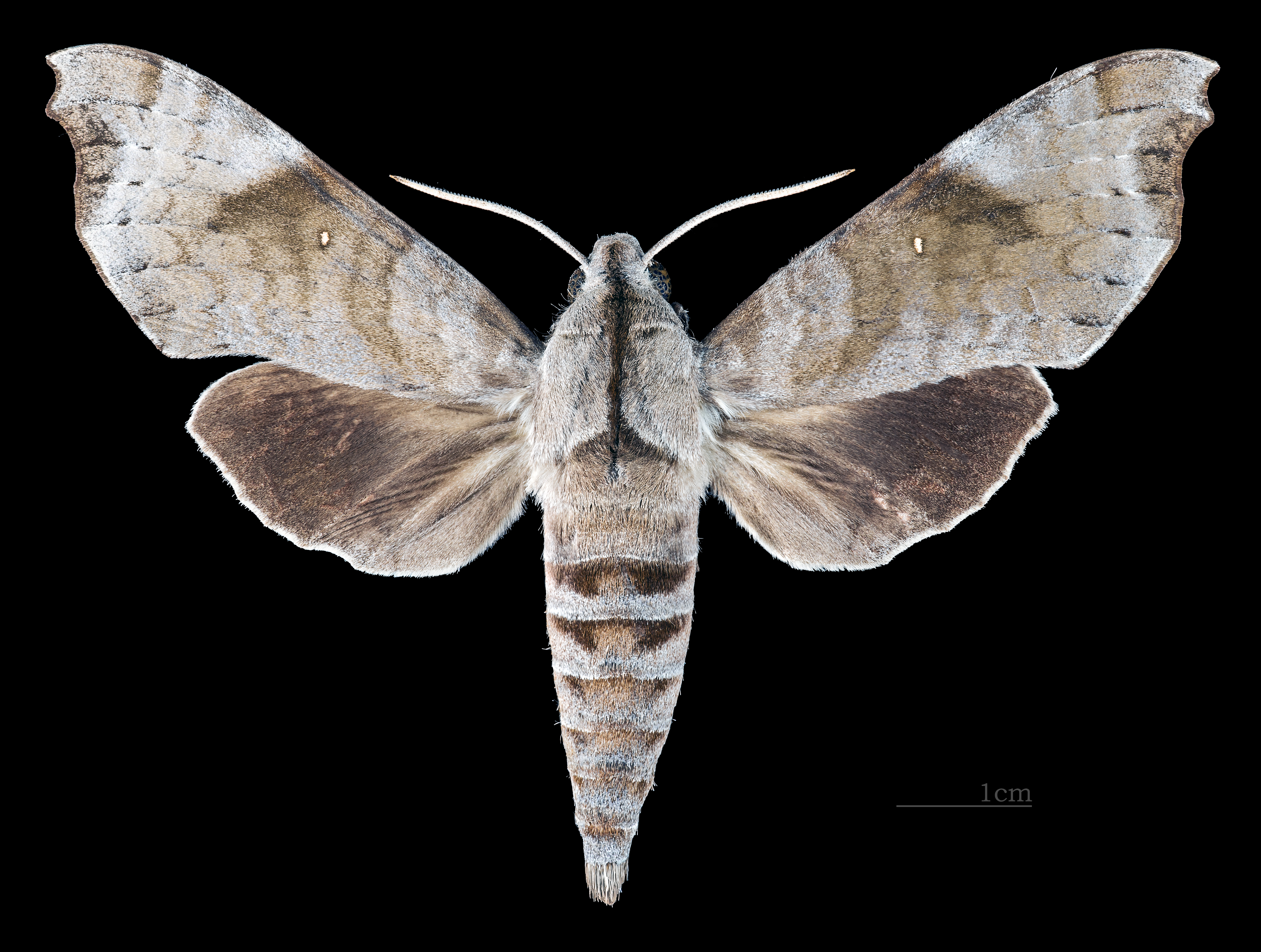
- Male dorsal view
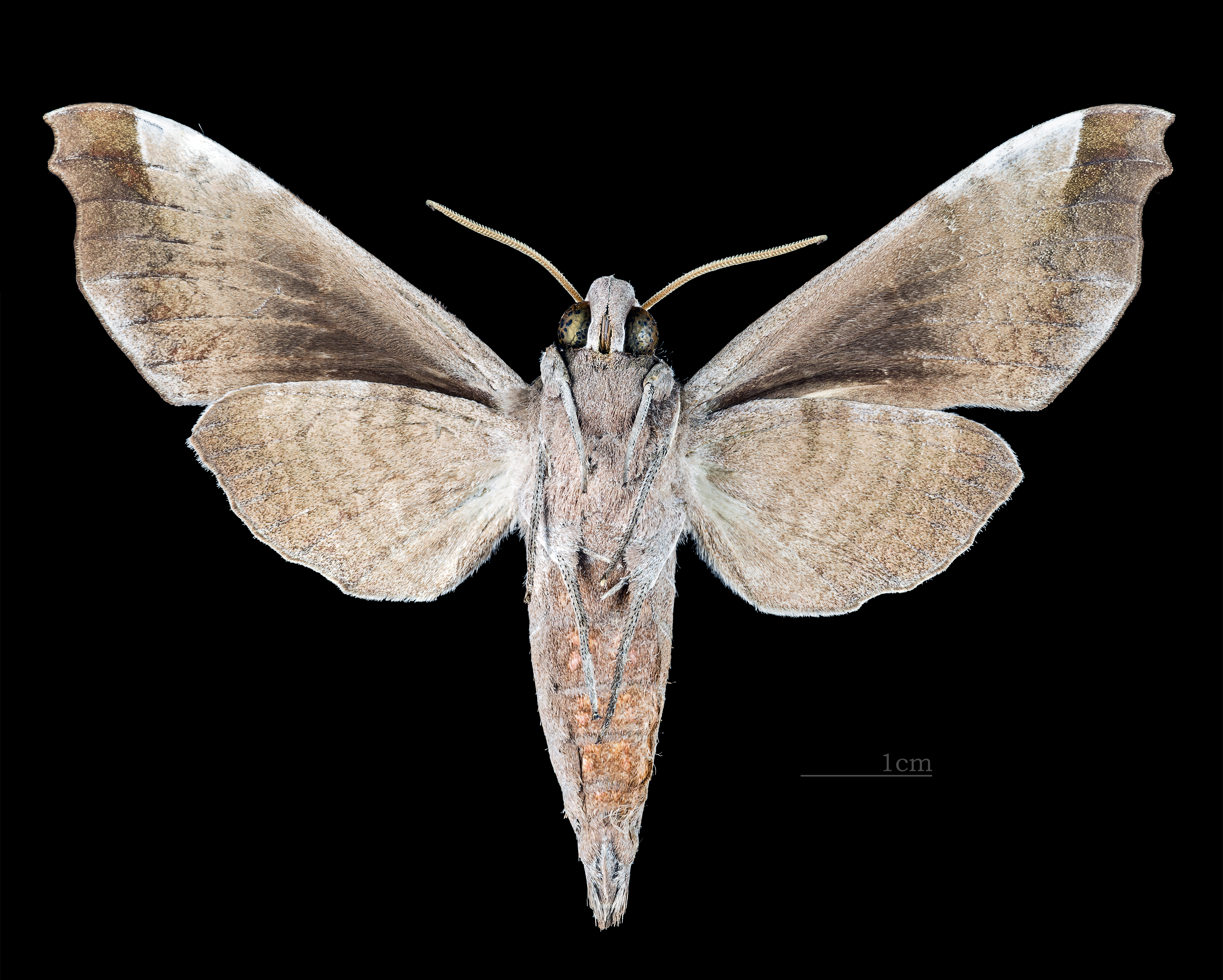
- Male ventral view

Scientific classification
- Domain: Eukaryota
- Kingdom: Animalia
- Phylum: Arthropoda
- Class: Insecta
- Order: Lepidoptera
- Family: Sphingidae
- Genus: Acosmeryx
- Species: A. miskini

Binomial name
- Acosmeryx miskini (Murray, 1873)

Synonyms
- Daphnusa miskini Murray, 1873

= Acosmeryx miskini =

Species of moth

Acosmeryx miskini is a moth of the family Sphingidae. It was described by Richard Paget Murray in 1873.

== Distribution ==
Species is known from New Guinea to north-eastern Australia.

== Description ==
The wingspan is about 80 mm. Adults have blotchy brown forewings and rusty-red hindwings, and dark marks each side of the abdomen.

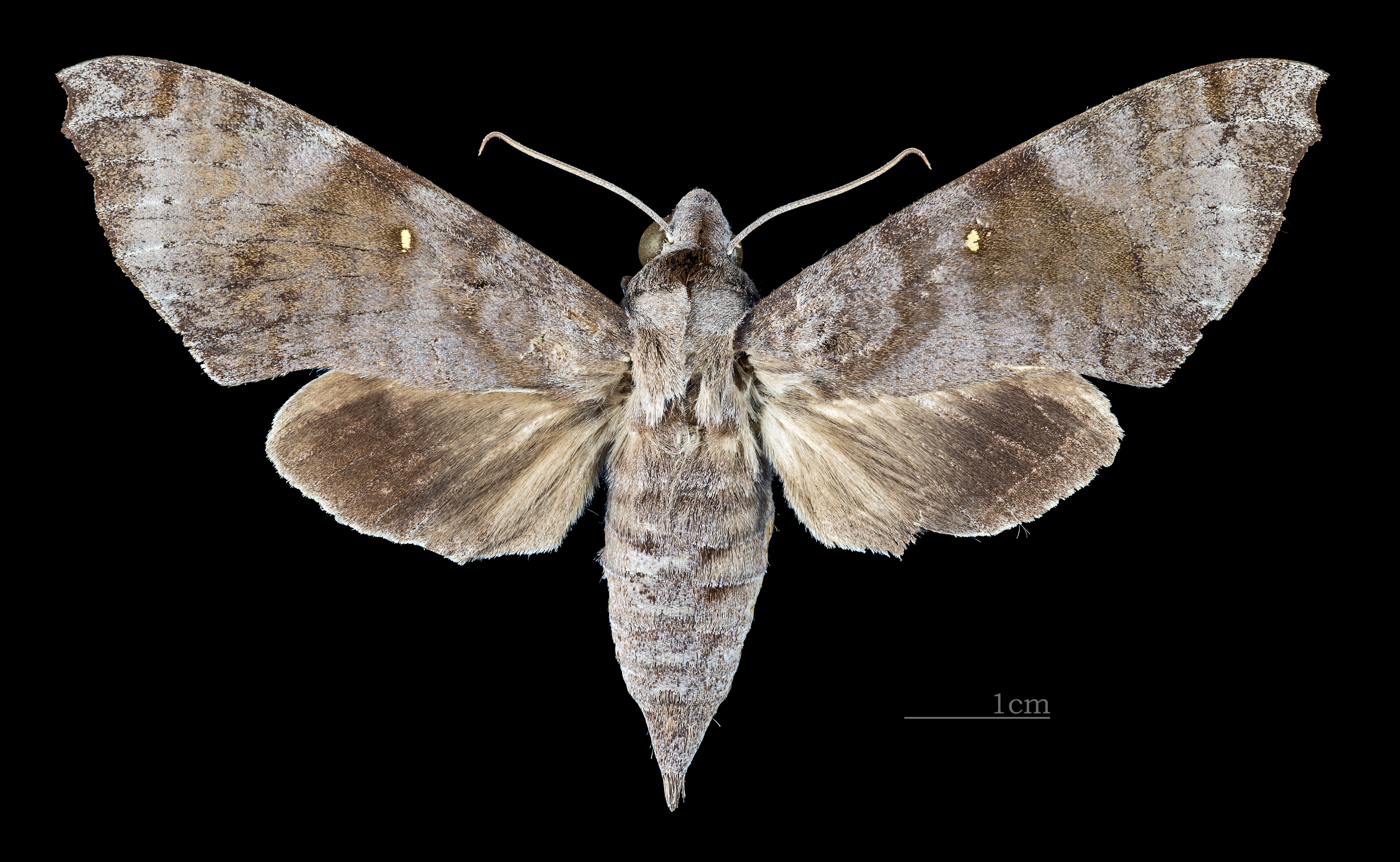
Female dorsal view

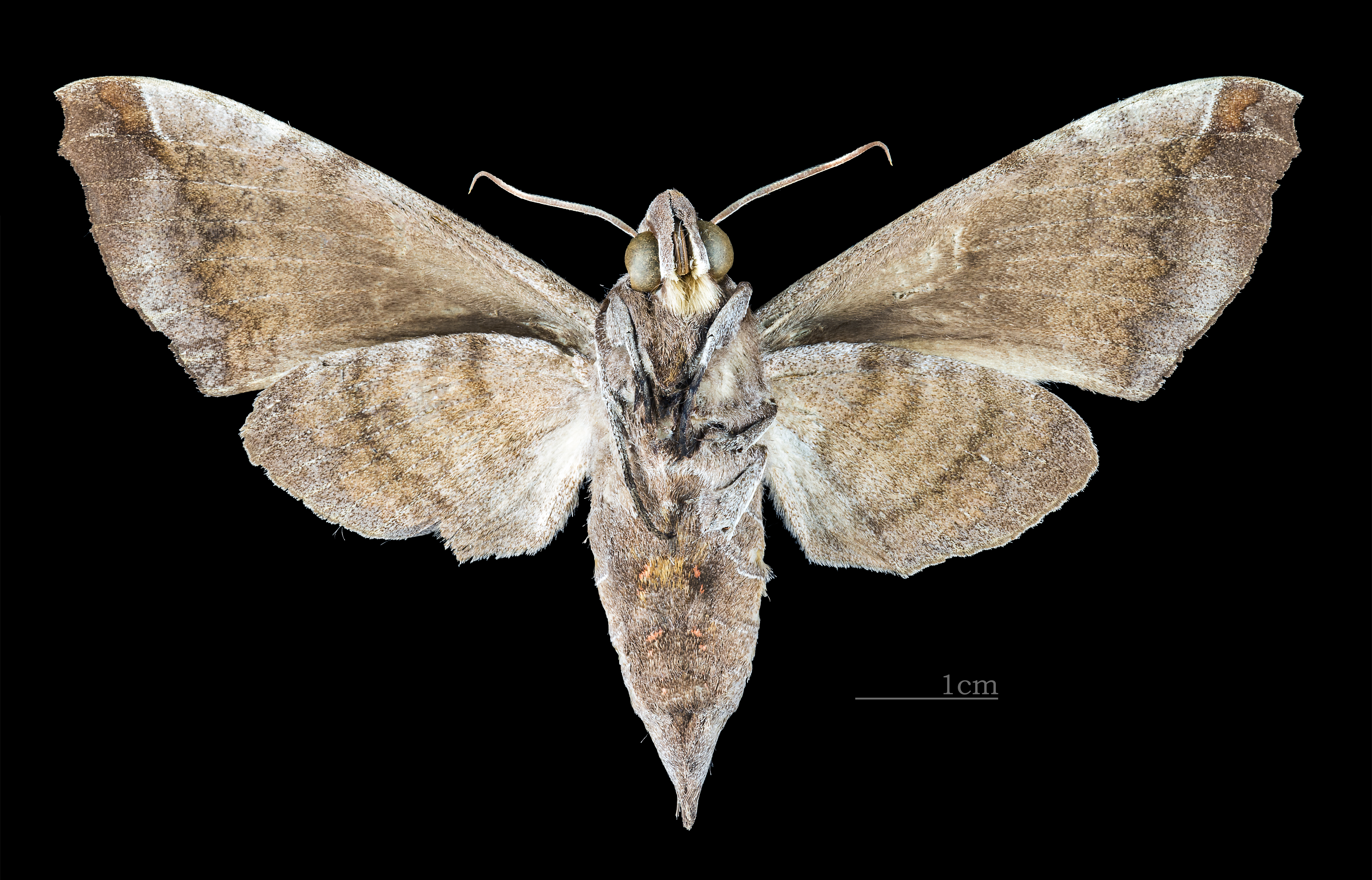
Female ventral view
