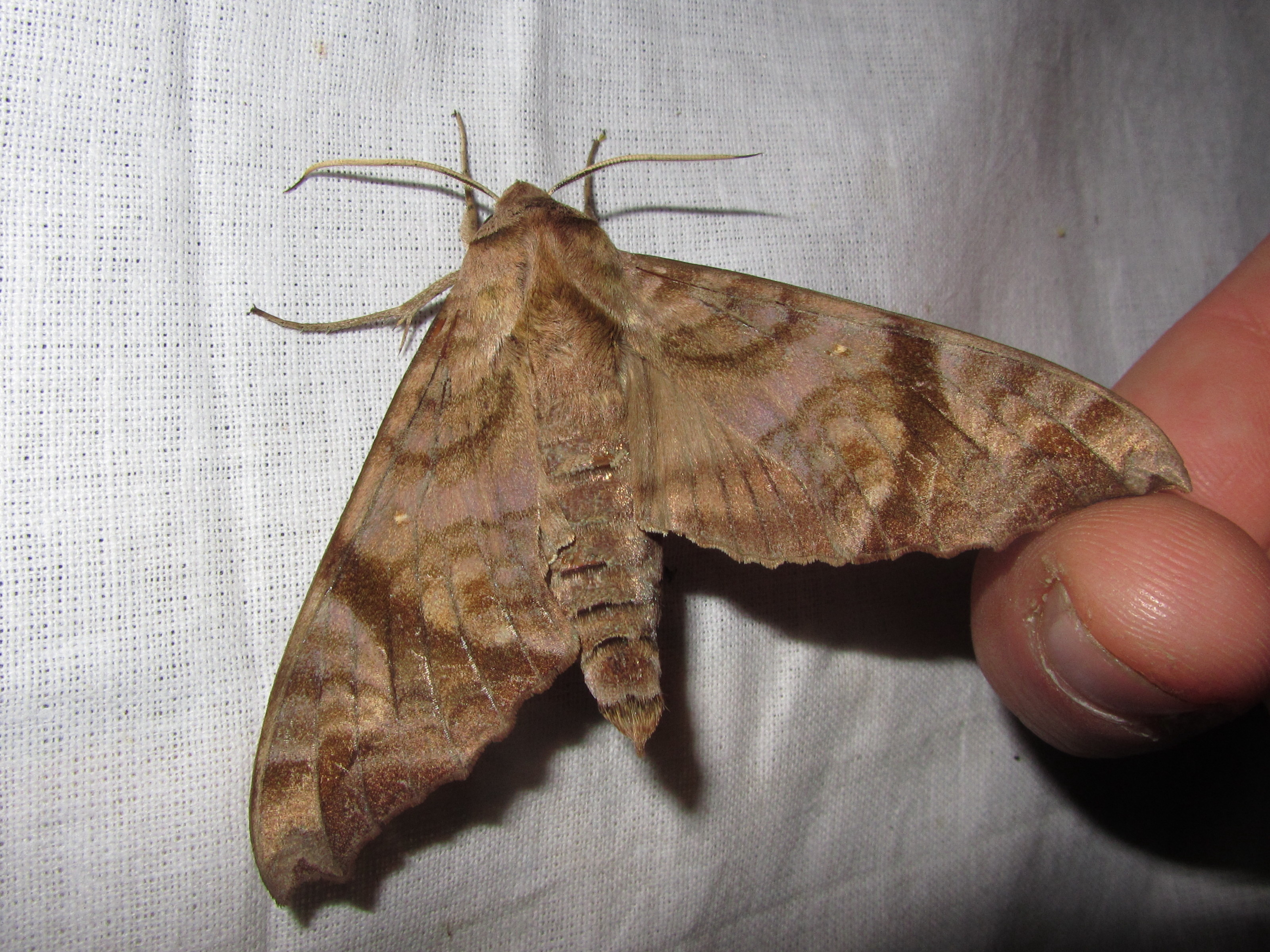

Scientific classification
- Domain: Eukaryota
- Kingdom: Animalia
- Phylum: Arthropoda
- Class: Insecta
- Order: Lepidoptera
- Family: Sphingidae
- Genus: Acosmeryx
- Species: A. omissa

Binomial name
- Acosmeryx omissa Rothschild & Jordan, 1903

= Acosmeryx omissa =

Species of moth

Acosmeryx omissa is a moth of the family Sphingidae. It was described by Rothschild and Jordan in 1903. It is known from south-east Asia, including Thailand.
