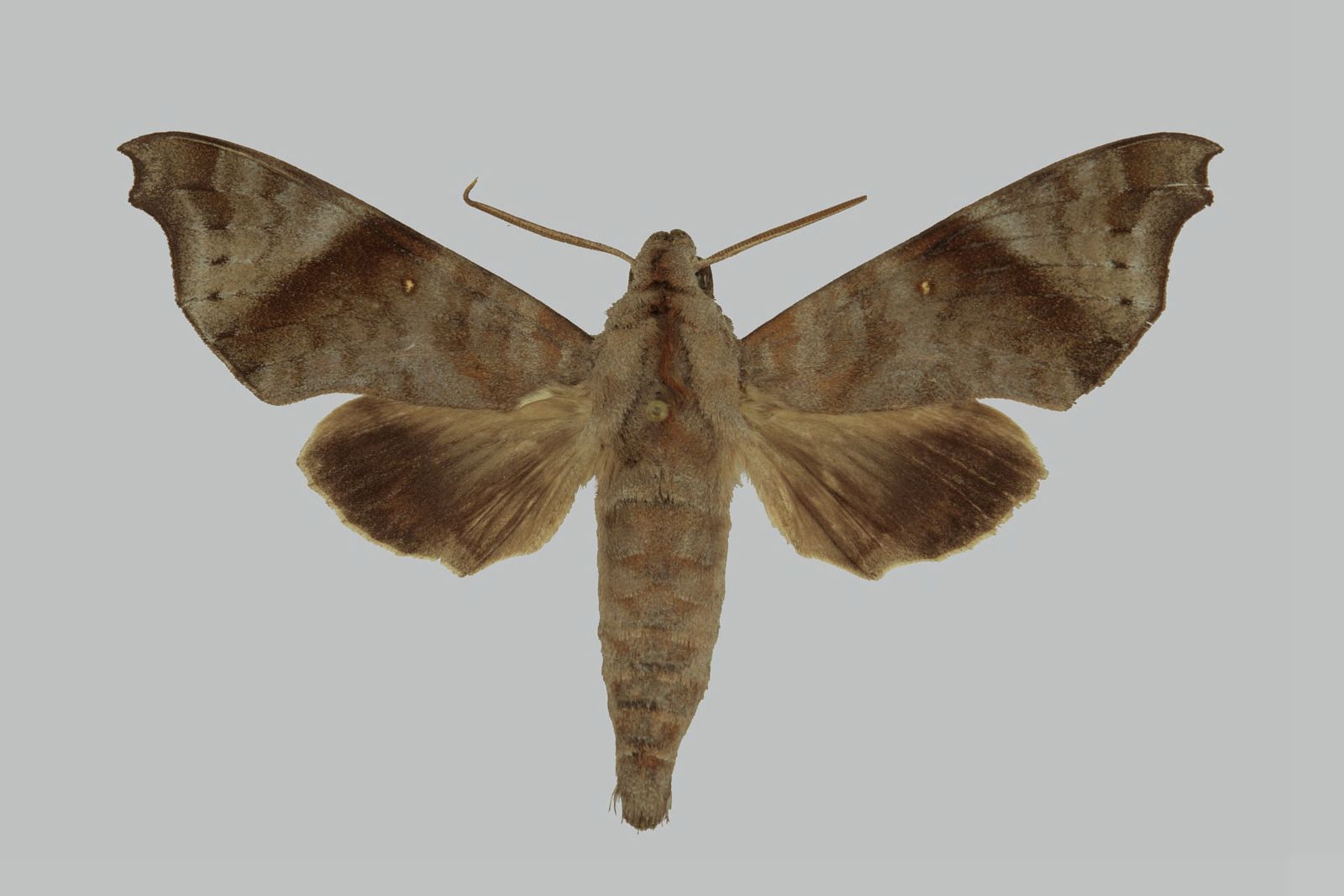
- Male, upperside
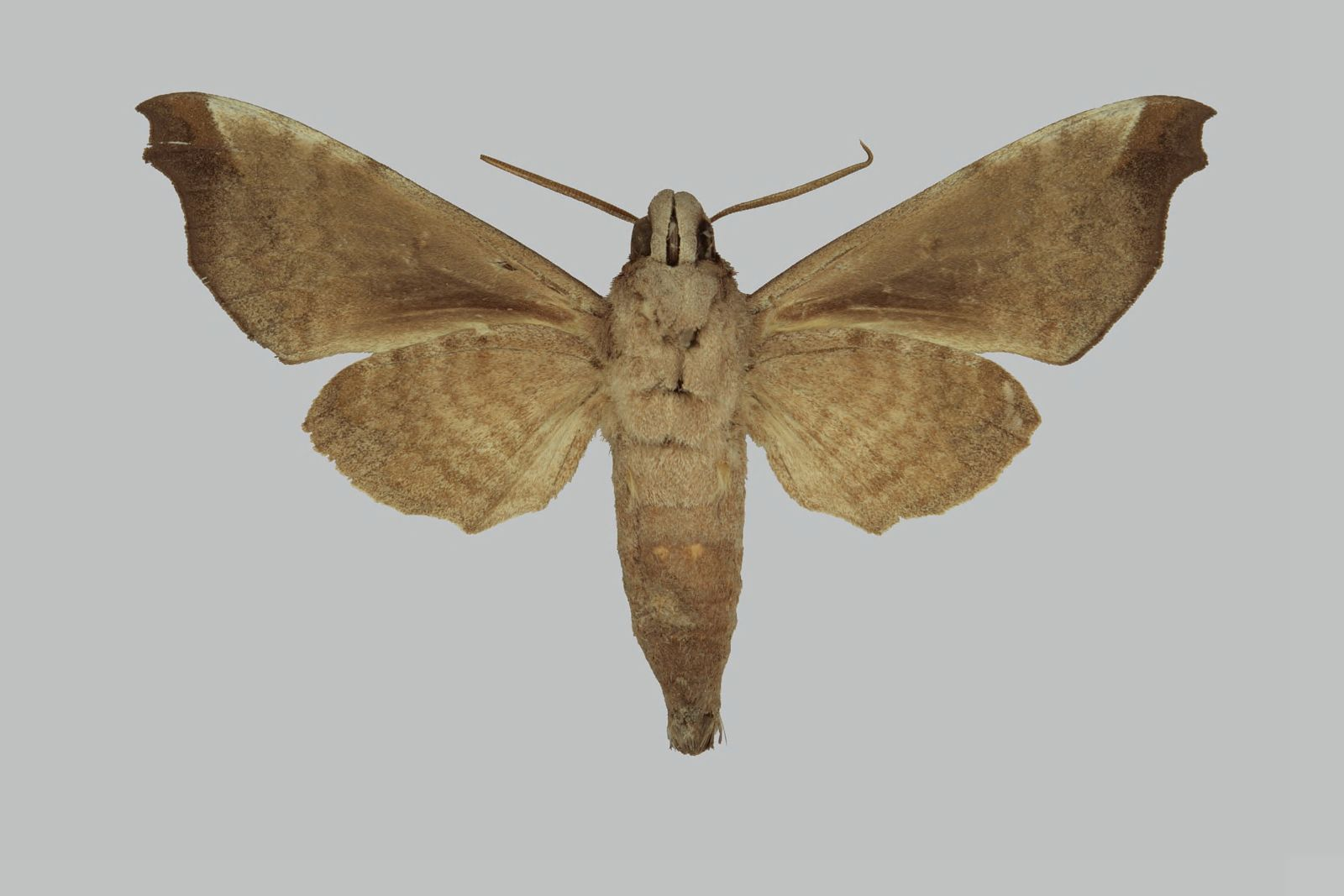
- Male, underside

Scientific classification
- Kingdom: Animalia
- Phylum: Arthropoda
- Clade: Pancrustacea
- Class: Insecta
- Order: Lepidoptera
- Family: Sphingidae
- Genus: Acosmeryx
- Species: A. beatae

Binomial name
- Acosmeryx beatae Cadiou, 2005

= Acosmeryx beatae =

Species of moth

Acosmeryx beatae is a moth of the family Sphingidae. It is known from Sulawesi.
