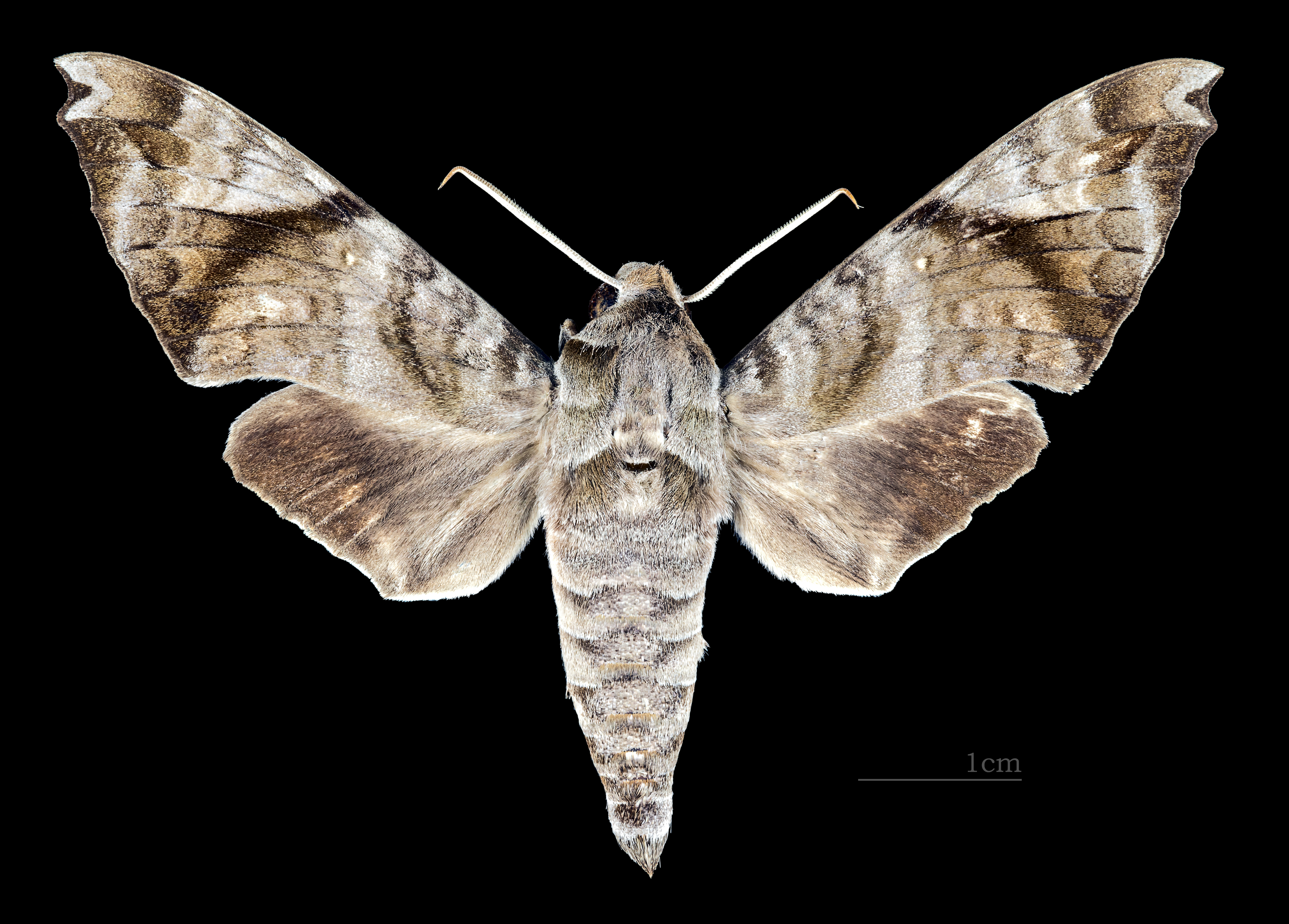
- Male, dorsal
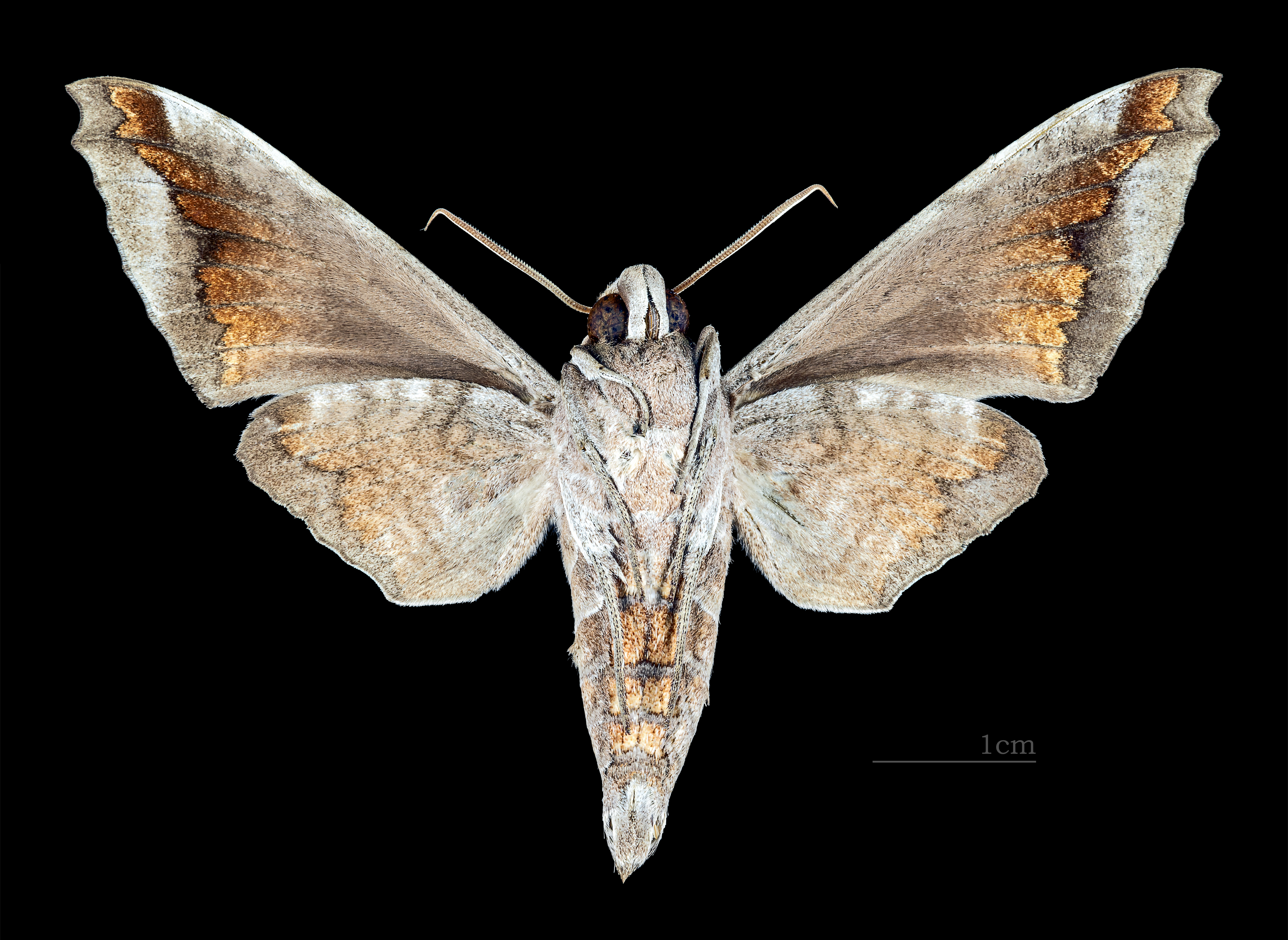
- Male, ventral

Scientific classification
- Domain: Eukaryota
- Kingdom: Animalia
- Phylum: Arthropoda
- Class: Insecta
- Order: Lepidoptera
- Family: Sphingidae
- Genus: Acosmeryx
- Species: A. pseudomissa

Binomial name
- Acosmeryx pseudomissa Mell, 1922

= Acosmeryx pseudomissa =

Species of moth

Acosmeryx pseudomissa is a moth of the family Sphingidae. It was described by Rudolf Mell in 1922. It is known from Thailand, southern China and Vietnam.

The larvae feed on Actinidia species.
