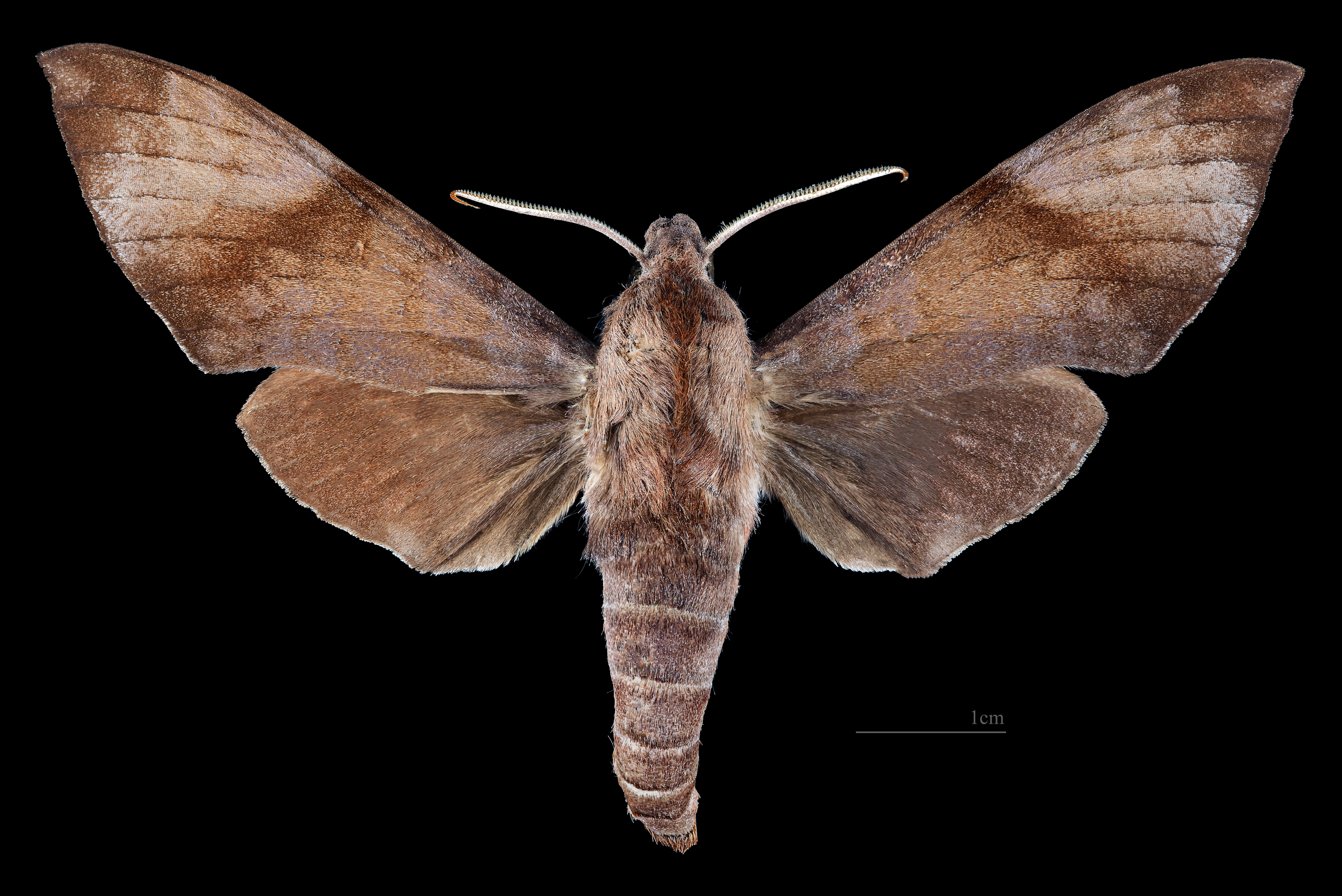
- Acosmeryx formosana ♂
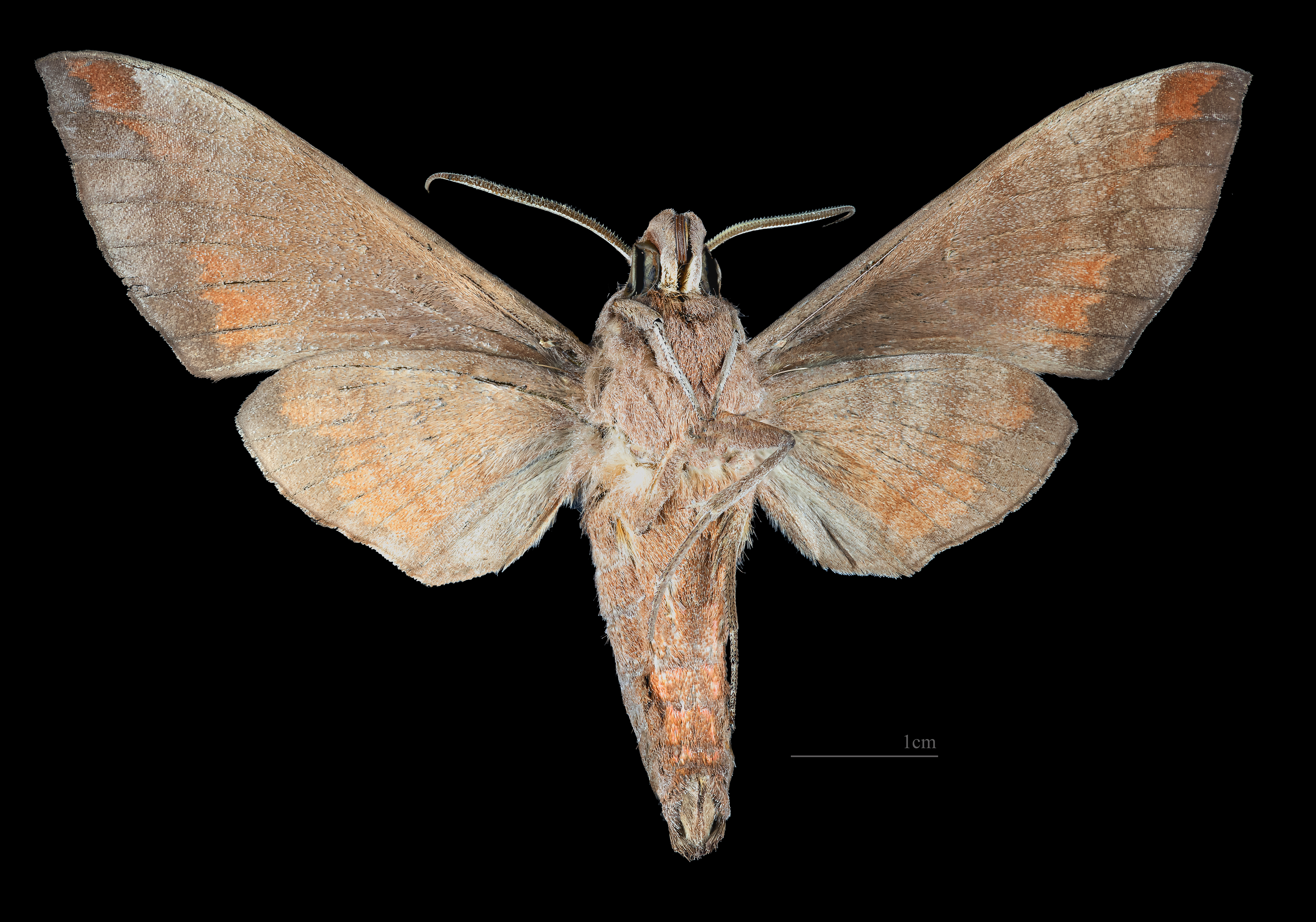
- Acosmeryx formosana ♂ △

Scientific classification
- Domain: Eukaryota
- Kingdom: Animalia
- Phylum: Arthropoda
- Class: Insecta
- Order: Lepidoptera
- Family: Sphingidae
- Genus: Acosmeryx
- Species: A. formosana

Binomial name
- Acosmeryx formosana (Matsumura, 1927)

Synonyms
- Ampelophaga formosana Matsumura, 1927

= Acosmeryx formosana =

Species of moth

Acosmeryx formosana is a moth of the family Sphingidae. It was described by Shōnen Matsumura in 1927. It is endemic to Taiwan.

The wingspan is 67–73 mm.
