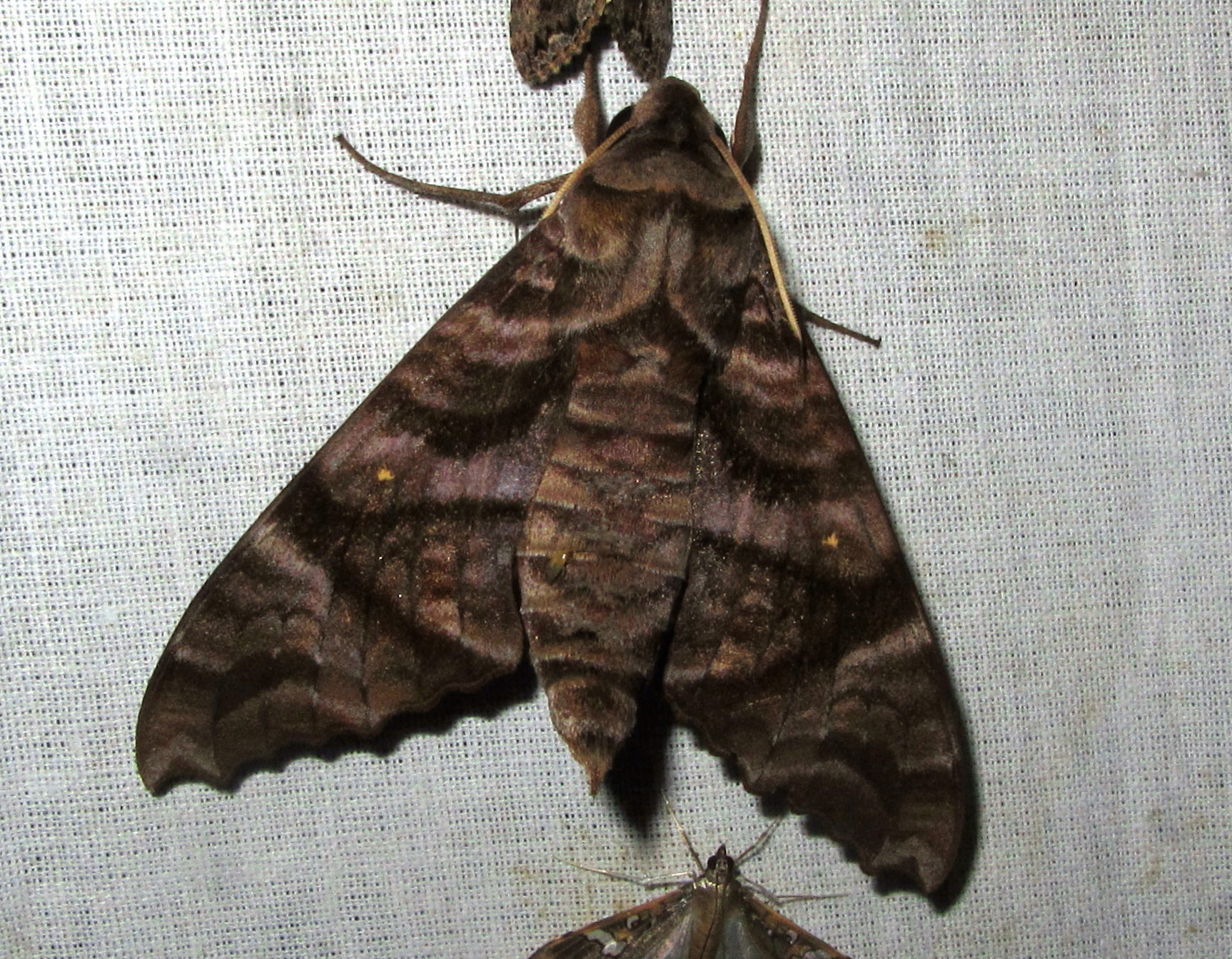

Scientific classification
- Domain: Eukaryota
- Kingdom: Animalia
- Phylum: Arthropoda
- Class: Insecta
- Order: Lepidoptera
- Family: Sphingidae
- Genus: Acosmeryx
- Species: A. sericeus

Binomial name
- Acosmeryx sericeus (Walker, 1856)

Synonyms
- Philampelus sericeus Walker, 1856; Acosmeryx anceoides Boisduval, 1875; Acosmeryx sericeus rufescens Mell, 1922

= Acosmeryx sericeus =

Species of moth

Acosmeryx sericeus is a moth of the family Sphingidae. It was described by Francis Walker in 1856.

== Distribution ==
Is known from Nepal, north-eastern India, Bangladesh, Thailand, southern China, Vietnam and Peninsular Malaysia.

== Description ==
Wingspan: 96–106 mm. Forewing with outer margin dentate. Forewing upperside general background colour violaceous-grey, with the brown lines more prominent than in other species of the genus; first discal line well-marked, running straight from vein M3 to the hind margin, merging anteriorly with an oblique line that reaches the outer margin just anterior to the hind angle; a grey submarginal band ends at or just beyond vein M3. Hindwing upperside with an indistinct brown discal line, distal to which is an equally indistinct, slightly tawny, paler band. Hindwing underside with conspicuous white scaling at costal margins, between the lines. Metanotum chocolate-tawny at sides. Abdomen upperside with chestnut brown markings of tergites prominent. Underside of abdomen, most of hindwing. and the disc of forewing along the marginal band bright tawny. Antenna shorter in male than in Acosmeryx naga naga.

In the male genitalia, gnathos widest in middle. Harpe with process more rounded distally than in Acosmeryx naga naga, with the ventral ridge higher and not dentate. Aedeagus with left process broad.

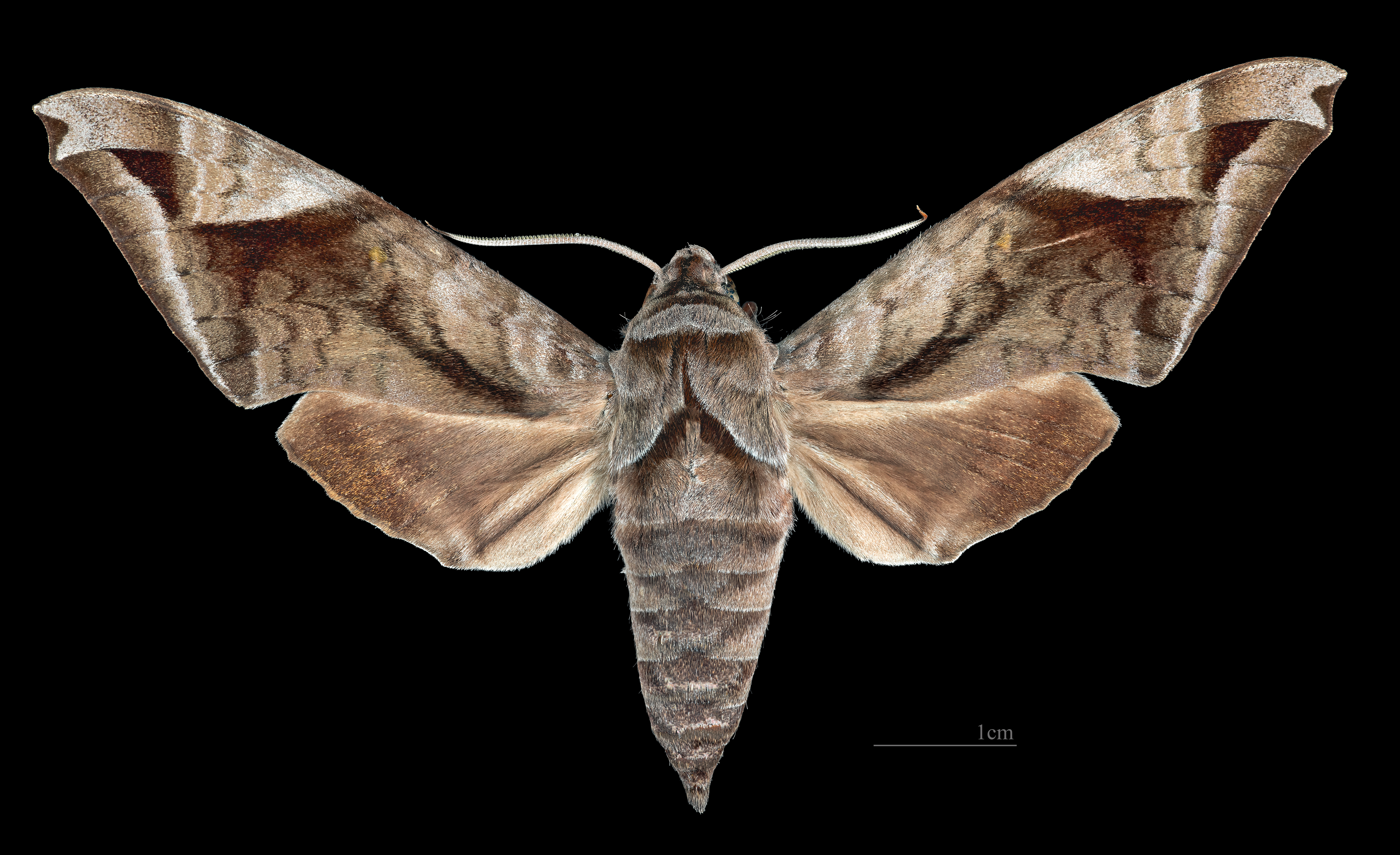
Acosmeryx sericeus ♂

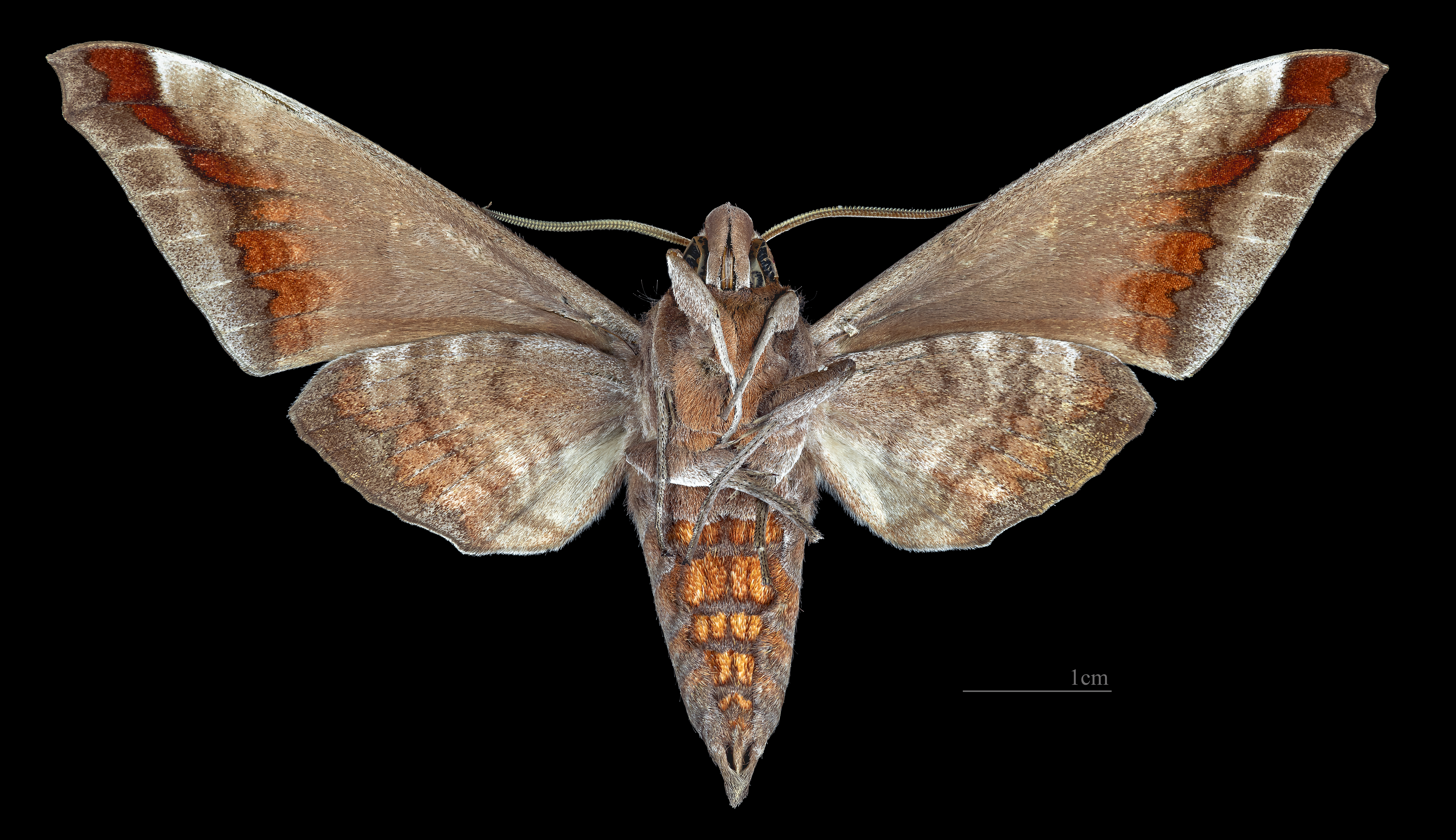
Acosmeryx sericeus ♂ △

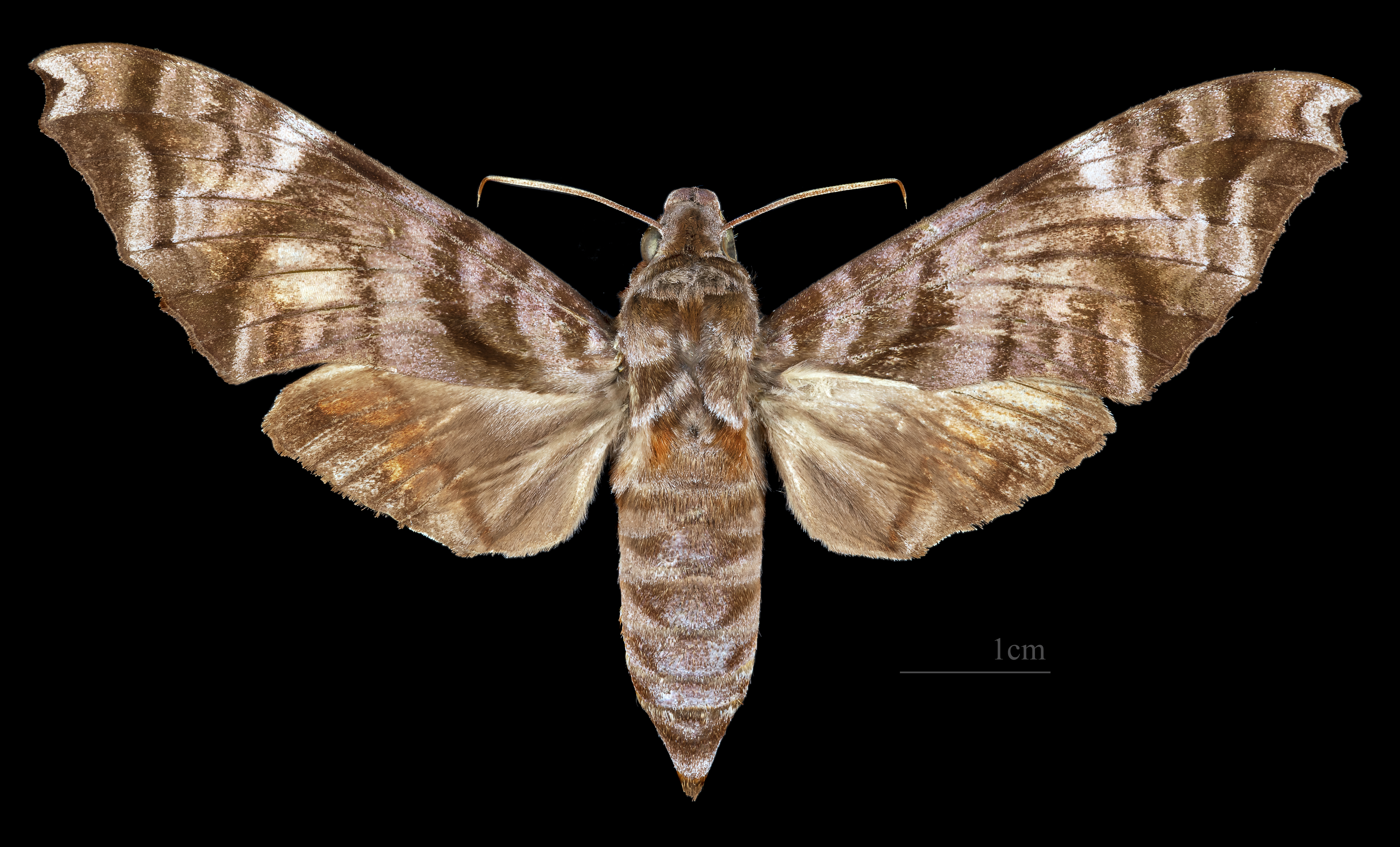
Acosmeryx sericeus ♀

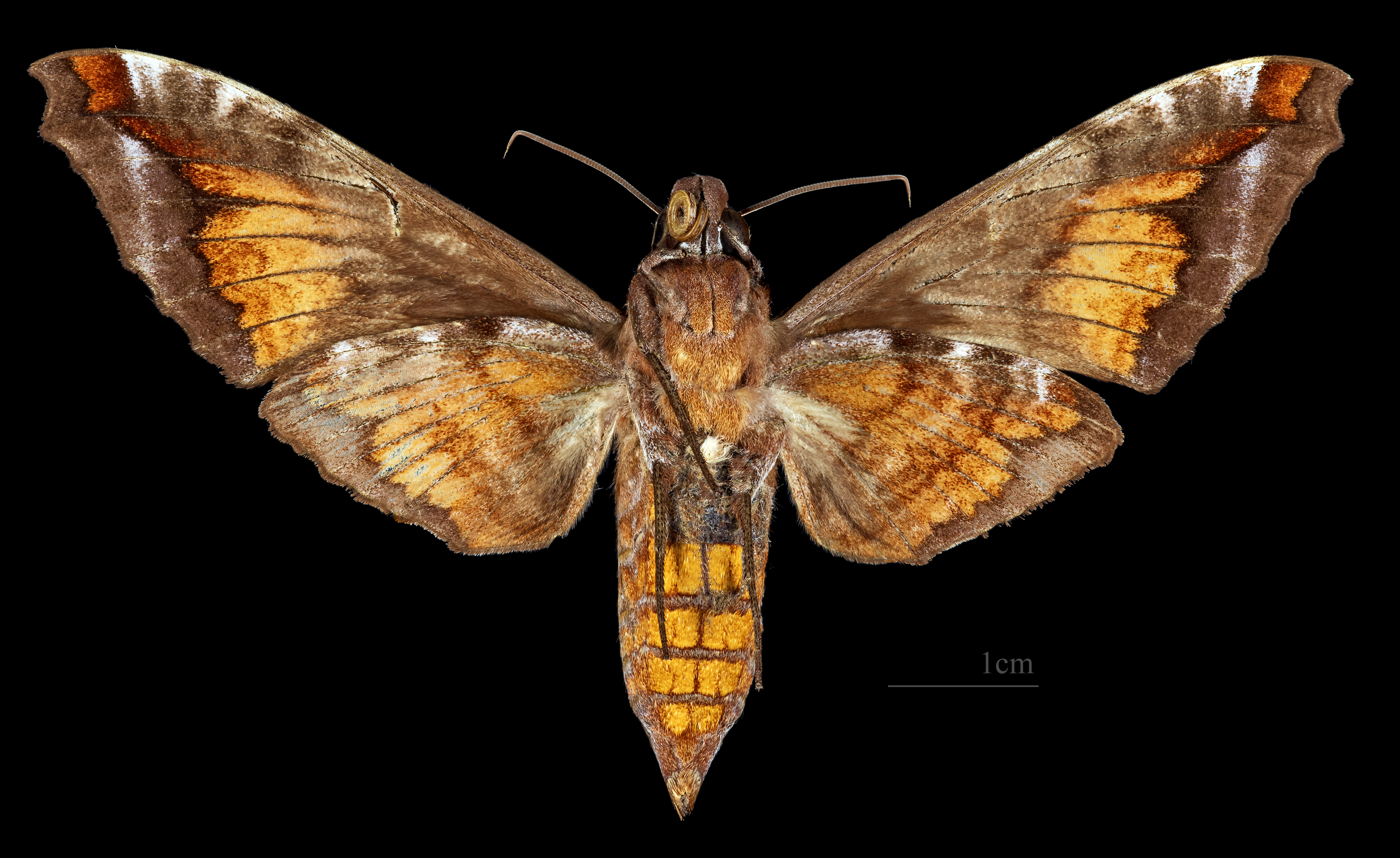
Acosmeryx sericeus ♀ △

== Global distribution ==
These moths are largely found in parts of Nepal, northeastern India, Bangladesh, Thailand, southern China, Vietnam and Malaysia (Peninsular).
