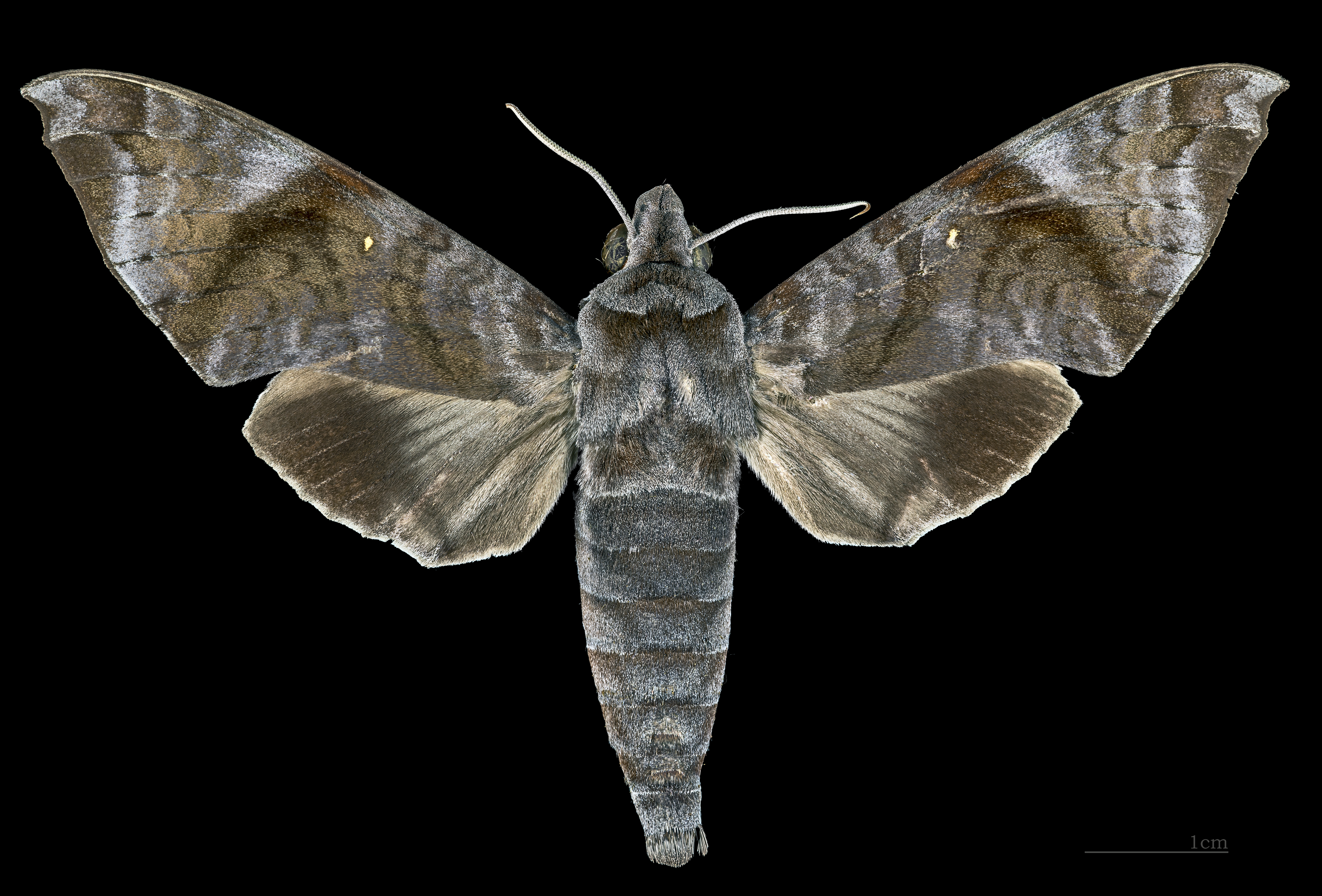
- Acosmeryx shervillii

Scientific classification
- Domain: Eukaryota
- Kingdom: Animalia
- Phylum: Arthropoda
- Class: Insecta
- Order: Lepidoptera
- Family: Sphingidae
- Subtribe: Macroglossina
- Genus: Acosmeryx; Boisduval, 1875

= Acosmeryx =

Genus of moths

Acosmeryx is a genus of moths in the family Sphingidae. The genus was erected by Jean Baptiste Boisduval in 1875.

== Species ==
- Acosmeryx acteus Pagenstecher, 1898
- Acosmeryx anceoides Boisduval, 1875
- Acosmeryx anceus (Stoll, 1781)
- Acosmeryx beatae Cadiou, 2005
- Acosmeryx castanea Rothschild & Jordan, 1903
- Acosmeryx formosana (Matsumura, 1927)
- Acosmeryx miskini (Murray, 1873)
- Acosmeryx miskinoides Vaglia & Haxaire, 2007
- Acosmeryx naga (Moore, 1858)
- Acosmeryx omissa Rothschild & Jordan, 1903
- Acosmeryx pseudomissa Mell, 1922
- Acosmeryx pseudonaga Butler, 1881
- Acosmeryx sericeus (Walker, 1856)
- Acosmeryx shervillii Boisduval, 1875
- Acosmeryx sinjaevi Brechlin & Kitching, 1996
- Acosmeryx socrates Boisduval, 1875
- Acosmeryx tenggarensis Brechlin & Kitching, 2007
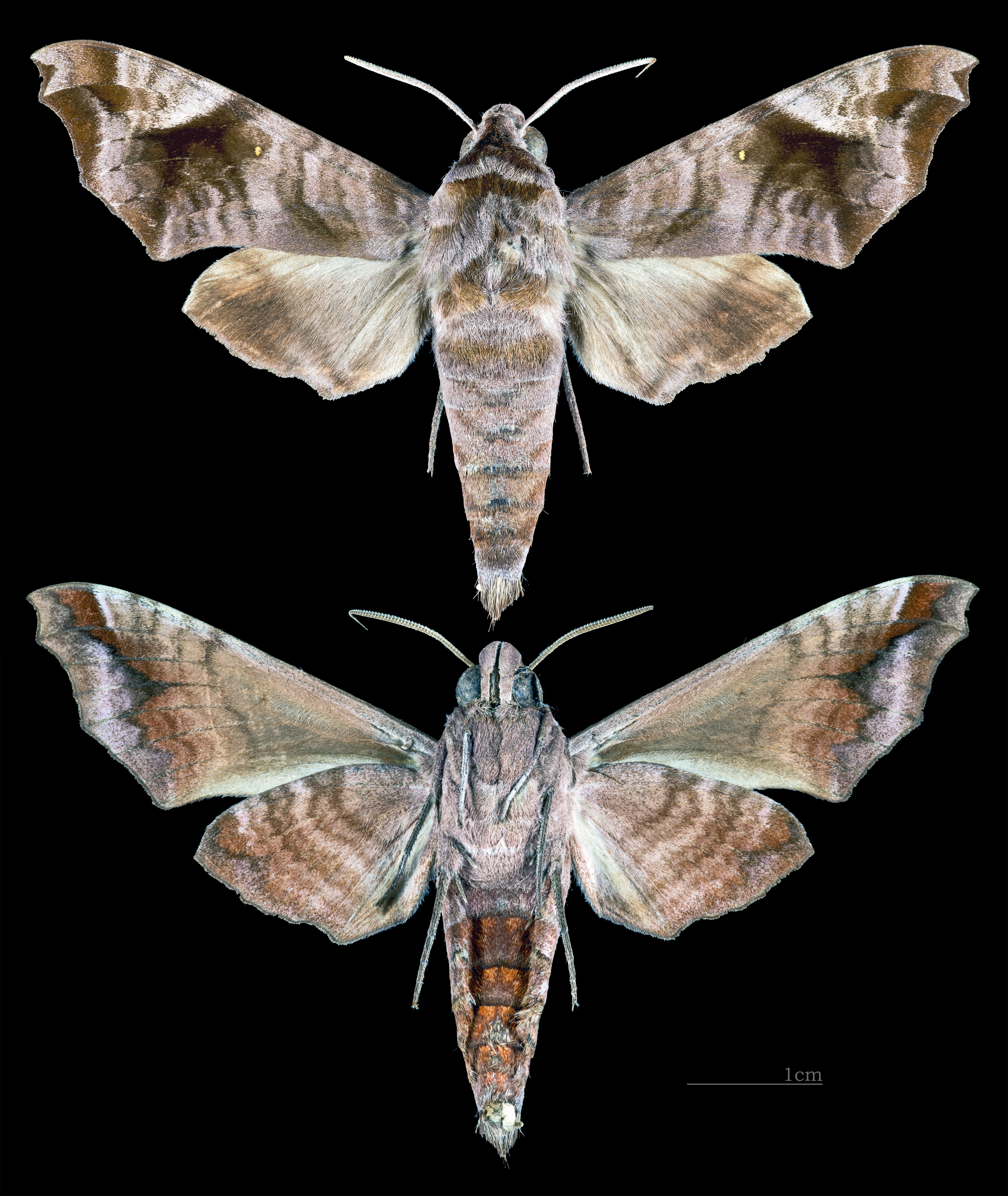
Acosmeryx anceus

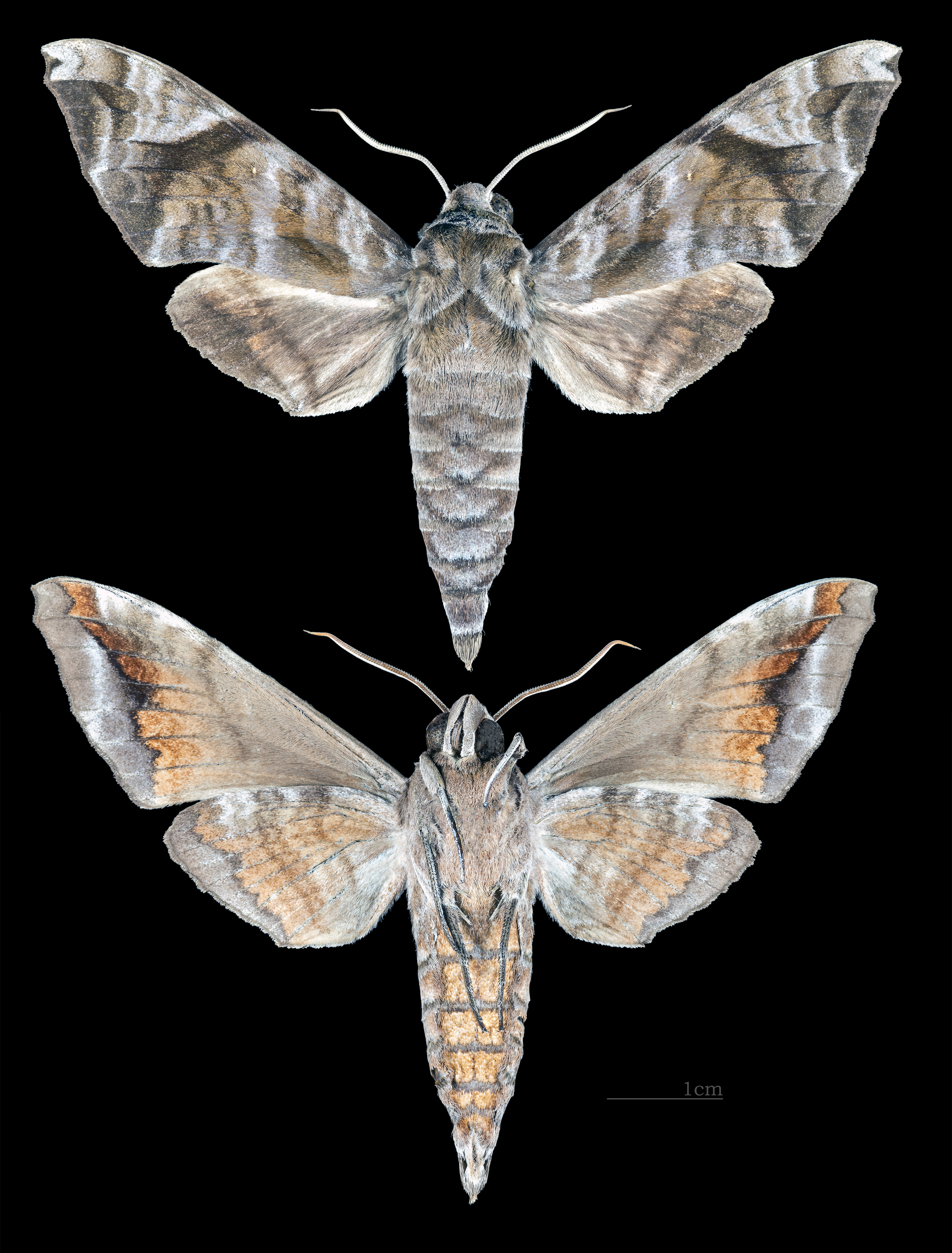
Acosmeryx castanea

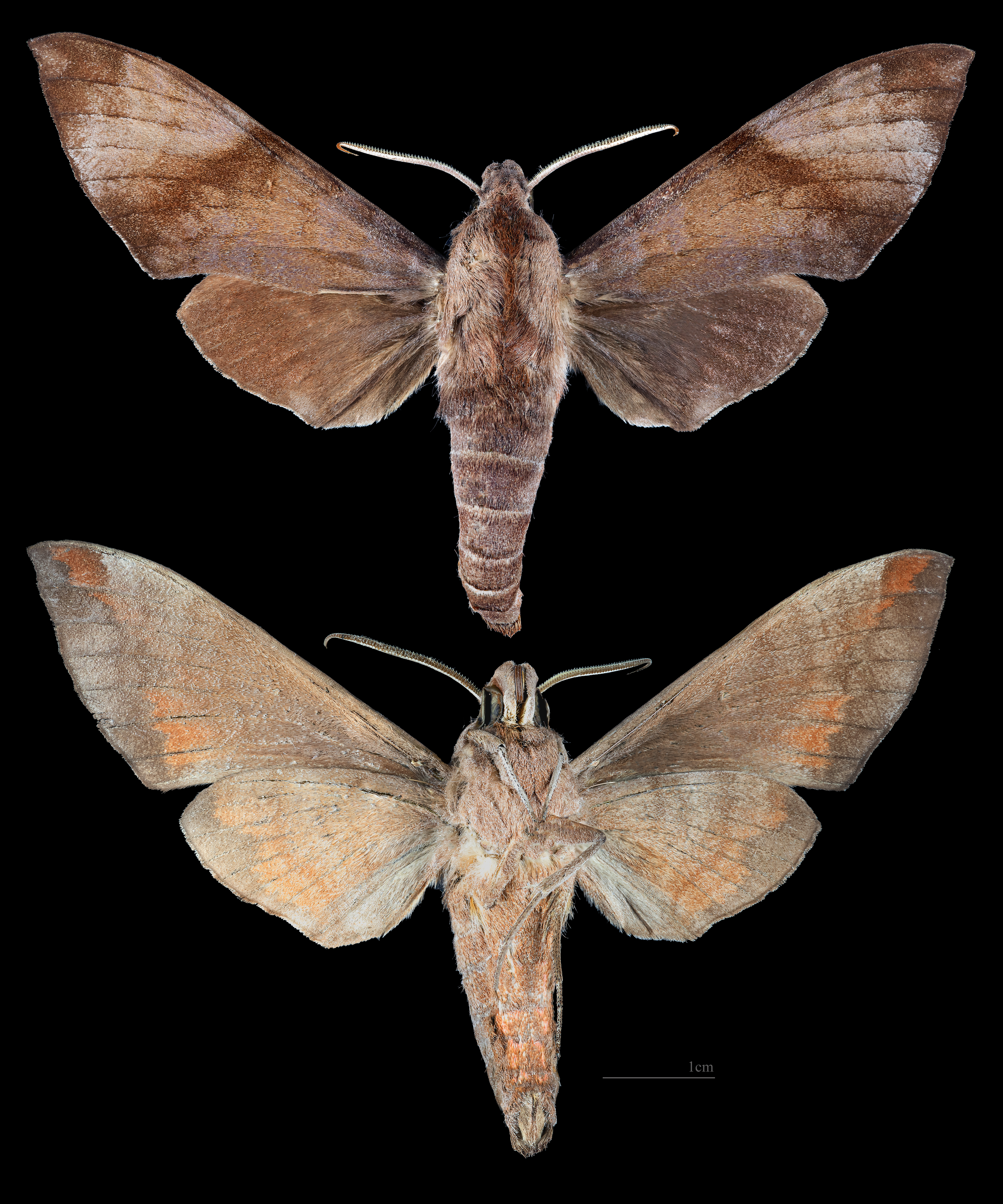
Acosmeryx formosana

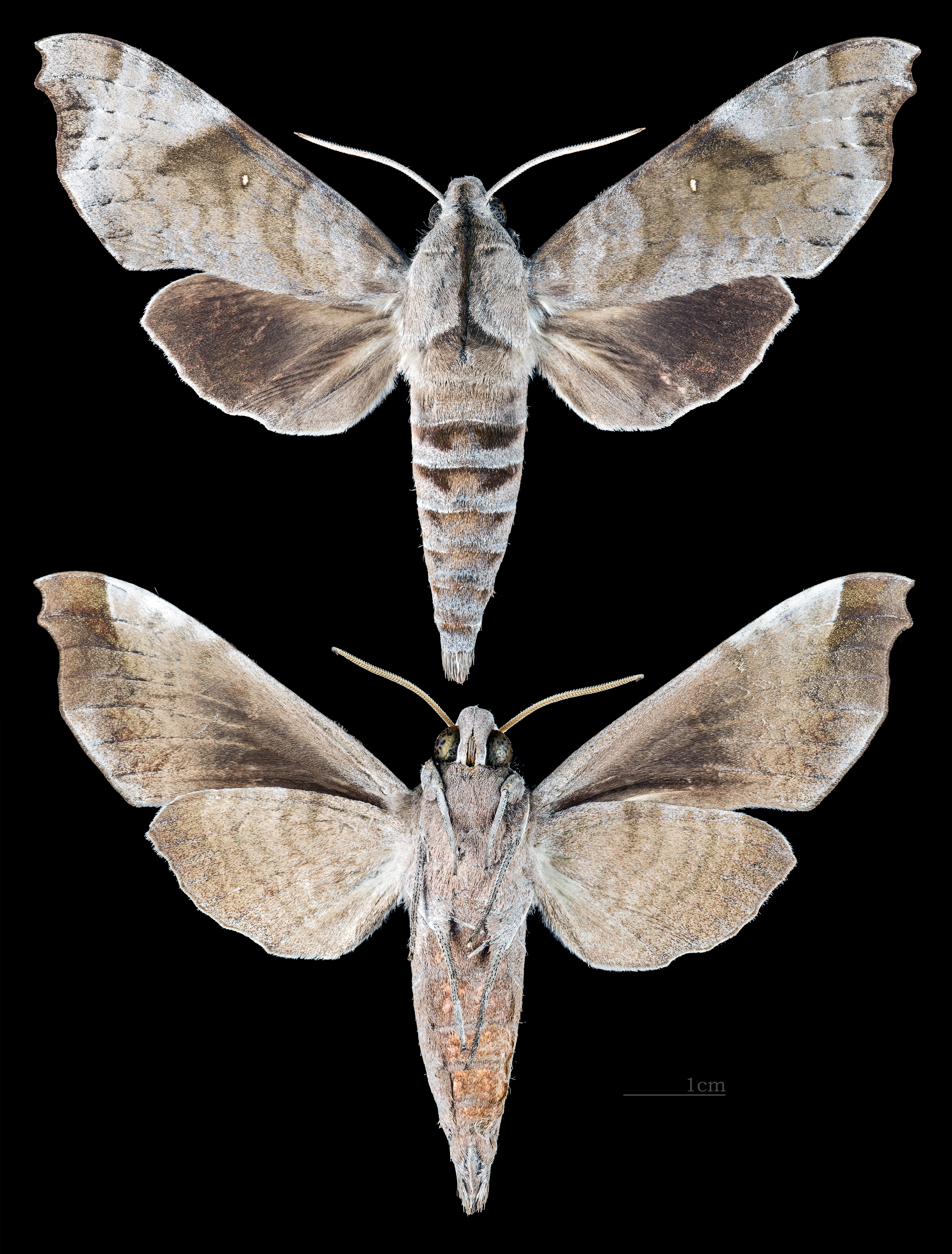
Acosmeryx miskini

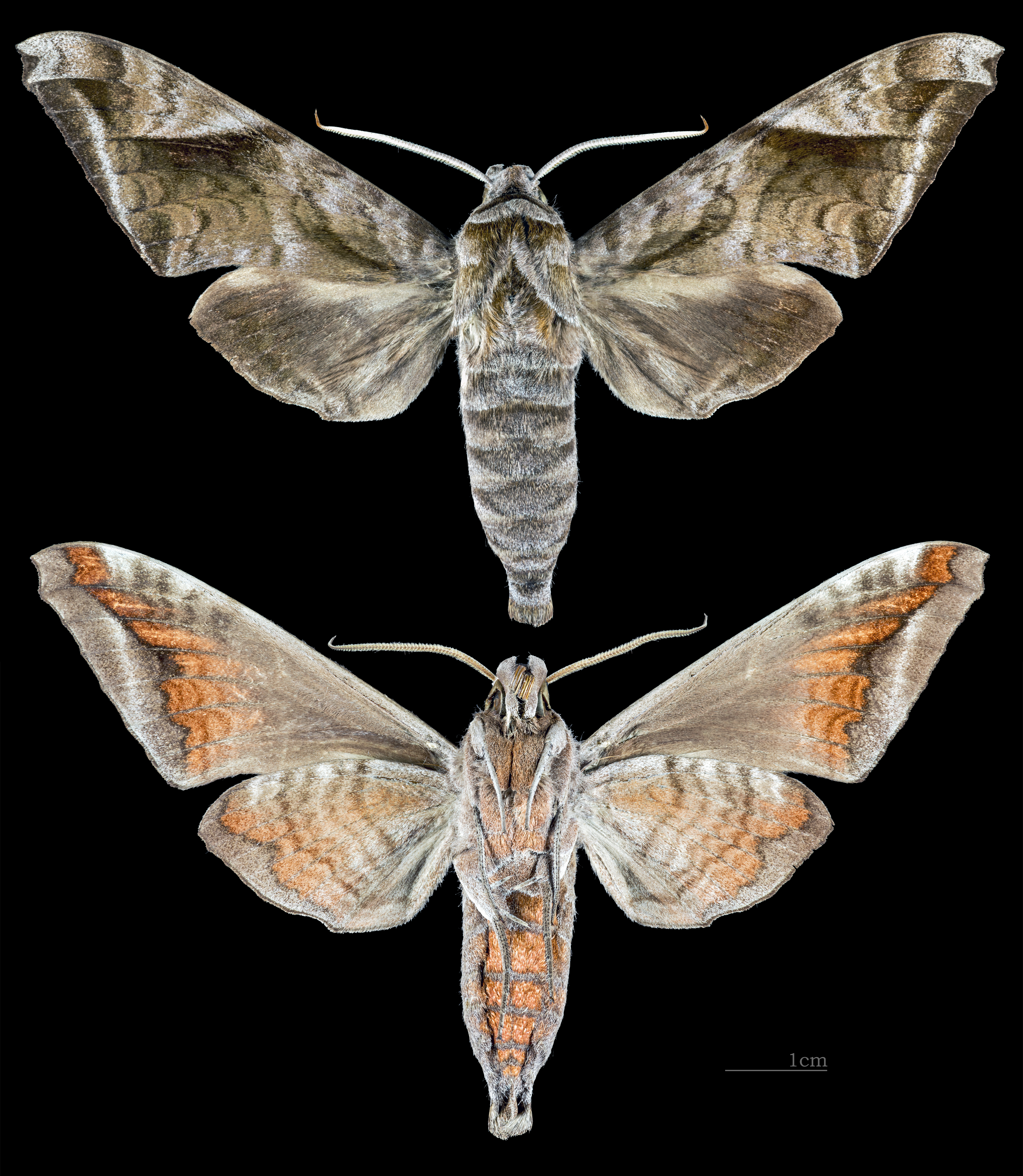
Acosmeryx naga

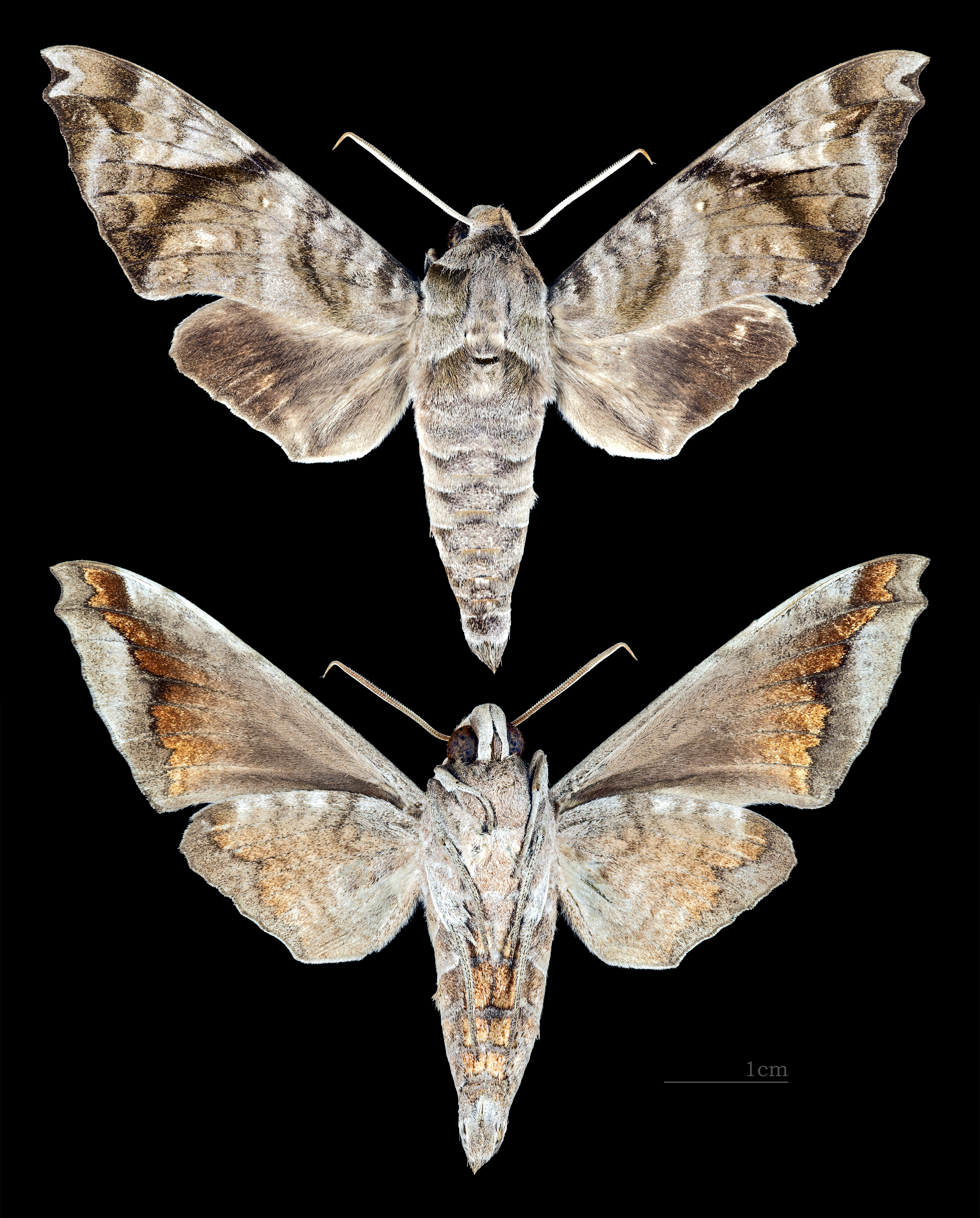
Acosmeryx pseudomissa

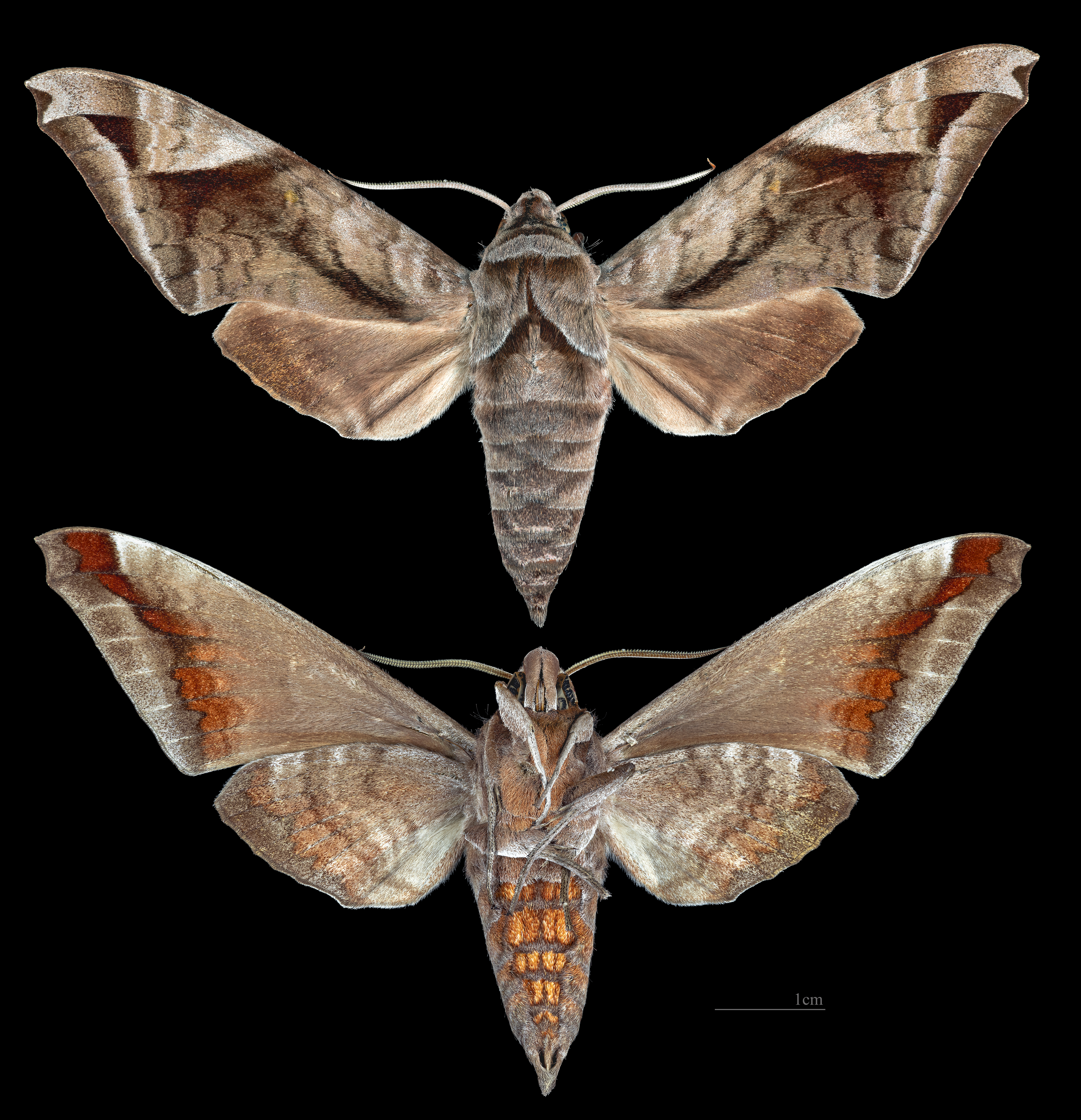
Acosmeryx sericeus

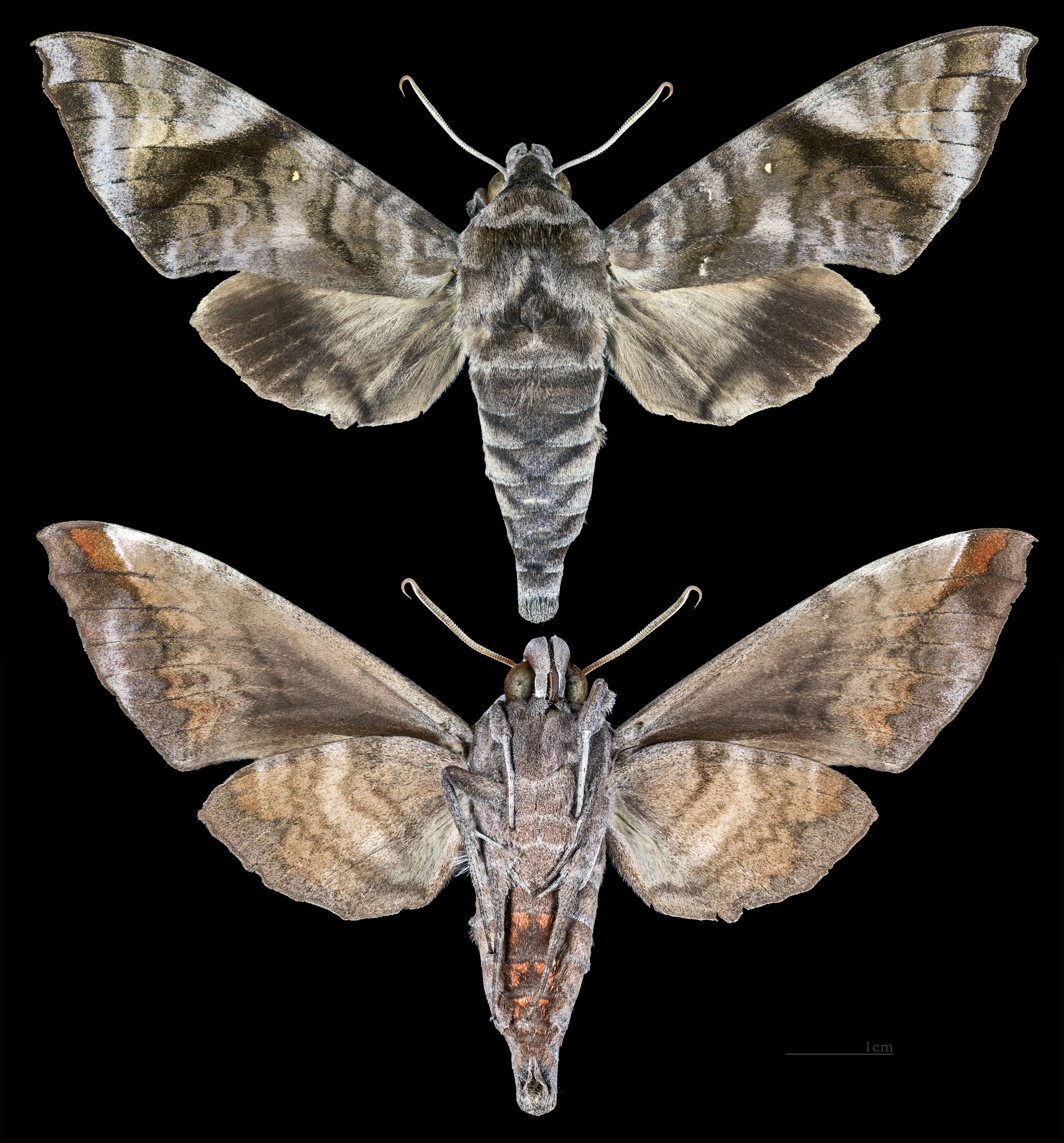
Acosmeryx shervillii

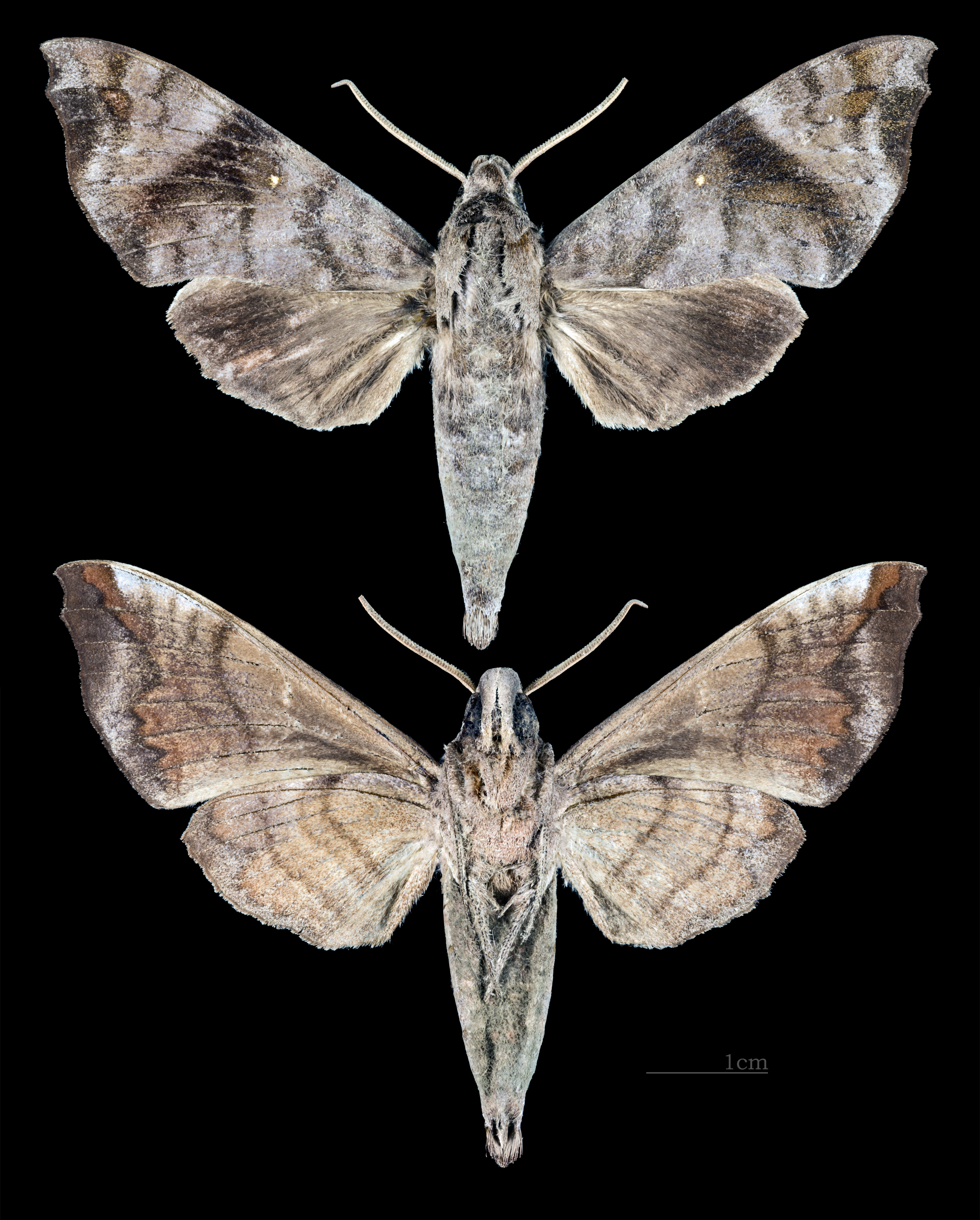
Acosmeryx socrates
