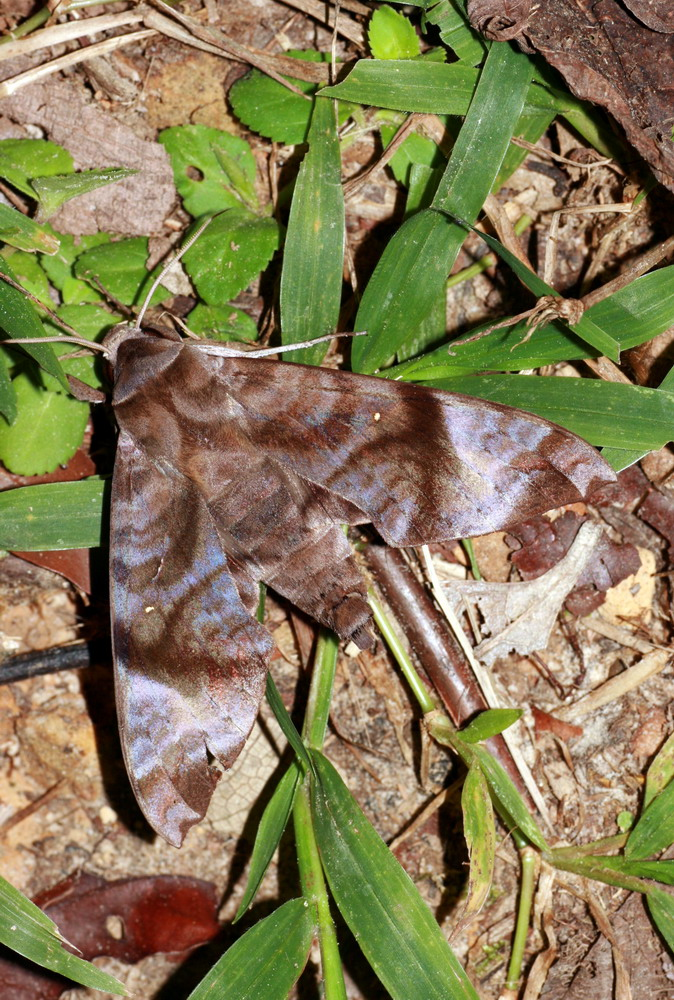

Scientific classification
- Kingdom: Animalia
- Phylum: Arthropoda
- Class: Insecta
- Order: Lepidoptera
- Family: Sphingidae
- Genus: Acosmeryx
- Species: A. shervillii

Binomial name
- Acosmeryx shervillii Boisduval, [1875]

Synonyms
- Acosmeryx ancea Hampson 1892; Acosmeryx cinerea Butler, 1875; Acosmeryx pseudonaga Butler, 1881; Acosmeryx miskini brooksi Clark, 1922; Acosmeryx socrates obliqua Dupont, 1941

= Acosmeryx shervillii =

Dull forest hawkmoth

Species of moth

Acosmeryx shervillii, the dull forest hawkmoth, is a moth of the family Sphingidae. The species was first described by Jean Baptiste Boisduval in 1875. It is found from the Indian subregion, Sri Lanka, to Sundaland, the Philippines and Sulawesi. Acosmeryx pseudonaga is sometimes treated as a valid species.

== Description ==
The colour varieties of the species have been described as separate species many times. However, they are classified as colour morphs of the single species A. shervillii.

According to The Fauna of British India, Including Ceylon and Burma: Moths Volume I by G. F. Hampson:

Greyish brown; the vertex of head dark; pro-, meso-, and meta- thorax each with a dark transverse streak; dorso-lateral oblique dark stripes on each segment of the abdomen. Fore wing with nine curved and waved antemedial dark lines, the interspaces between three of the pairs of lines being filled in with dark brown, so as to form one subbasal and two antemedial bands; a dark-ringed pale speck at end of cell, the pale center being sometimes obsolete; four postmedial curved lines; an oblique dark band from beyond the middle of the costa to outer angle, in some of the forms produced outwards along vein 5 so as to be more oblique; a pale submarginal obsolescent line from below the apex to outer angle, sometimes carried out to the margin at vein 4. Hind wing brownish fuscous, with traces of a pale patch and dark lines near anal angle. Underside more or less suffused with ferruginous, ochreous, and grey; the outer margin of both wings dark; hind wing with five indistinct lines.......larva green; a series of brown dorsal spots and of lateral oblique stripes on 5th to 10th somites; an ocellated spot on 4th somite; a black stripe from 1st to 4th somite, with a yellow line above it; horn brown.

— The Fauna of British India, Including Ceylon and Burma: Moths Volume I

== Biology ==
There are three or more generations in Hong Kong, occurring from early March until early October. The larvae have been recorded on Saurauia, Dillenia, Leea, Cayratia, Cissus and Vitis species.

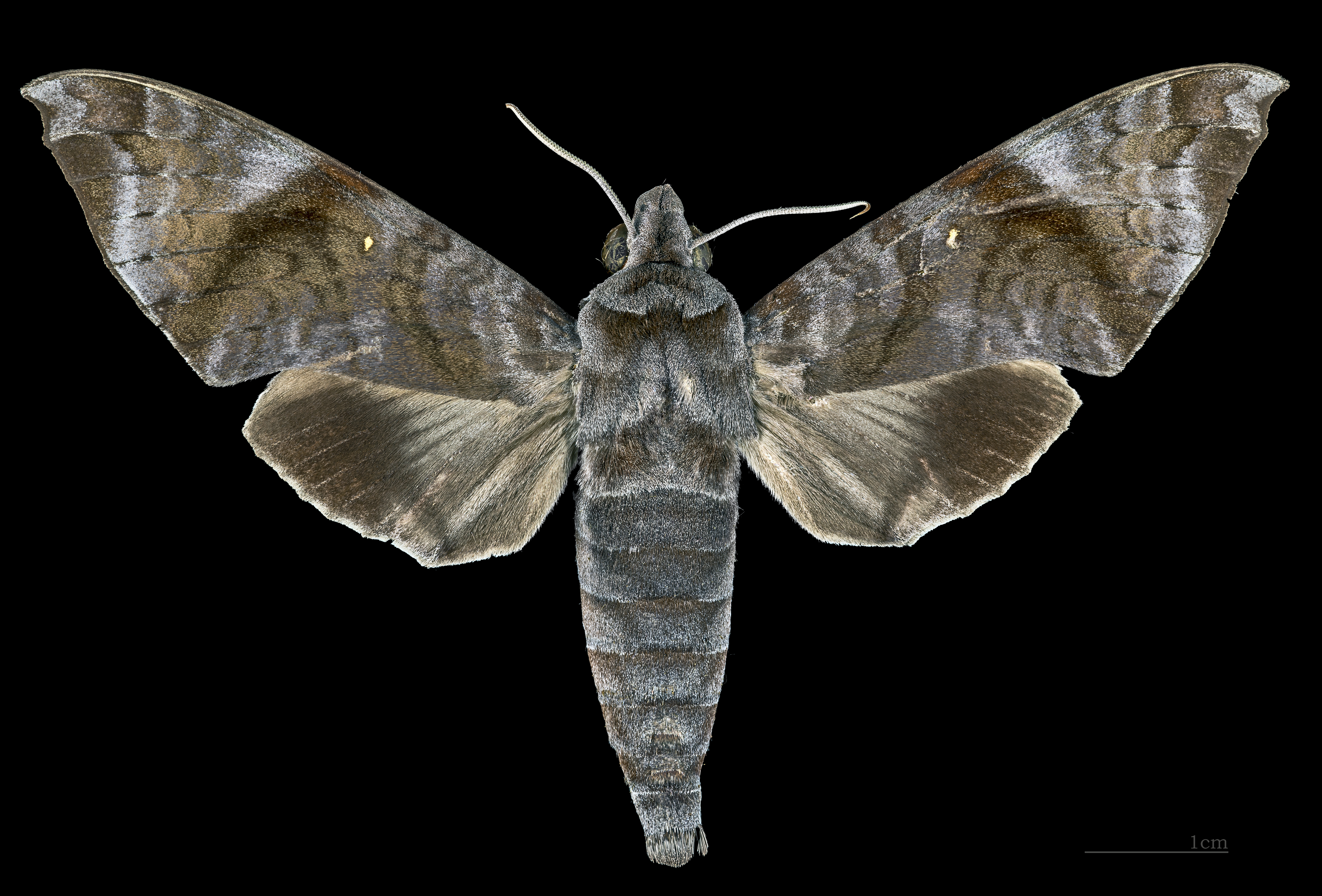
Male

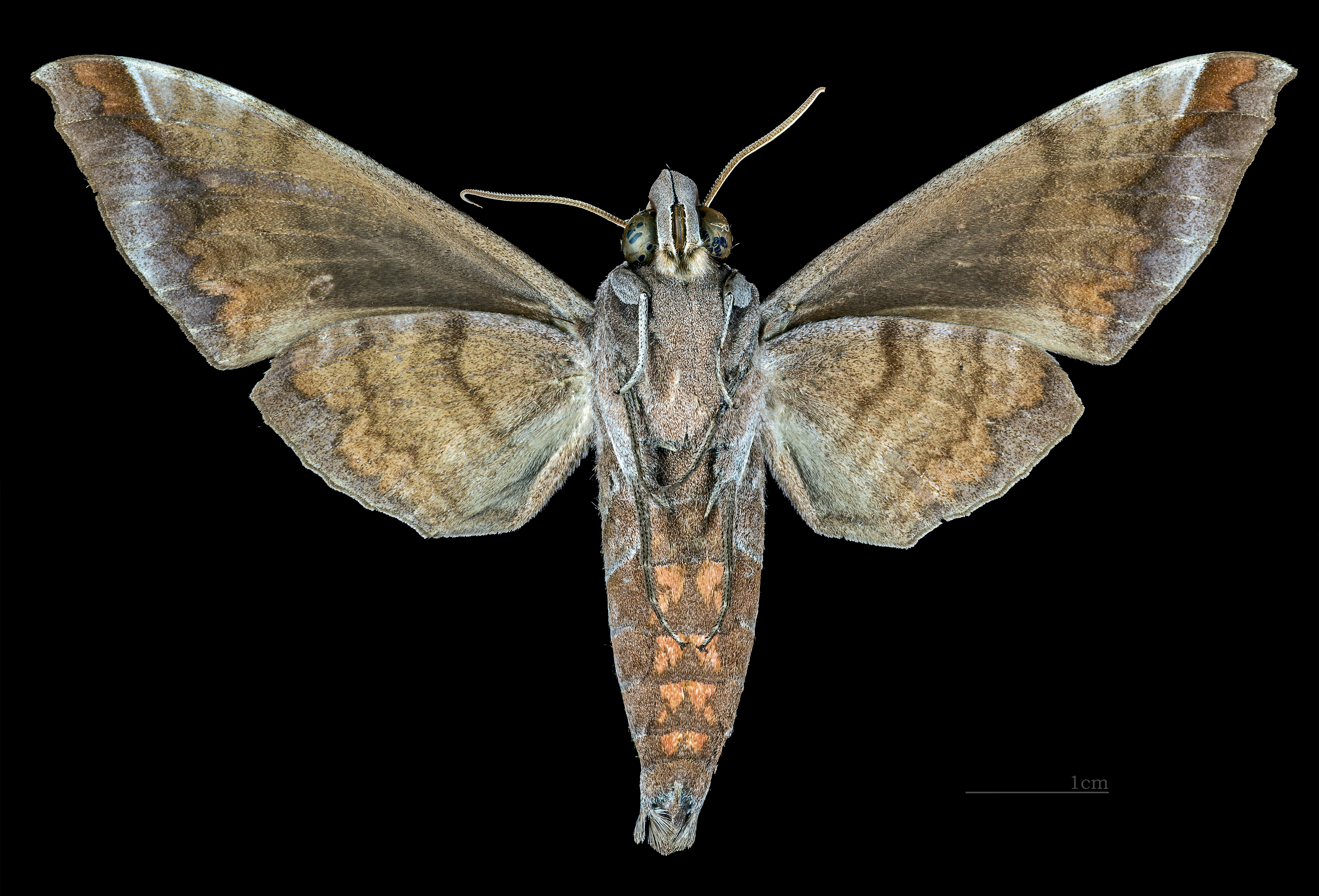
Male underside

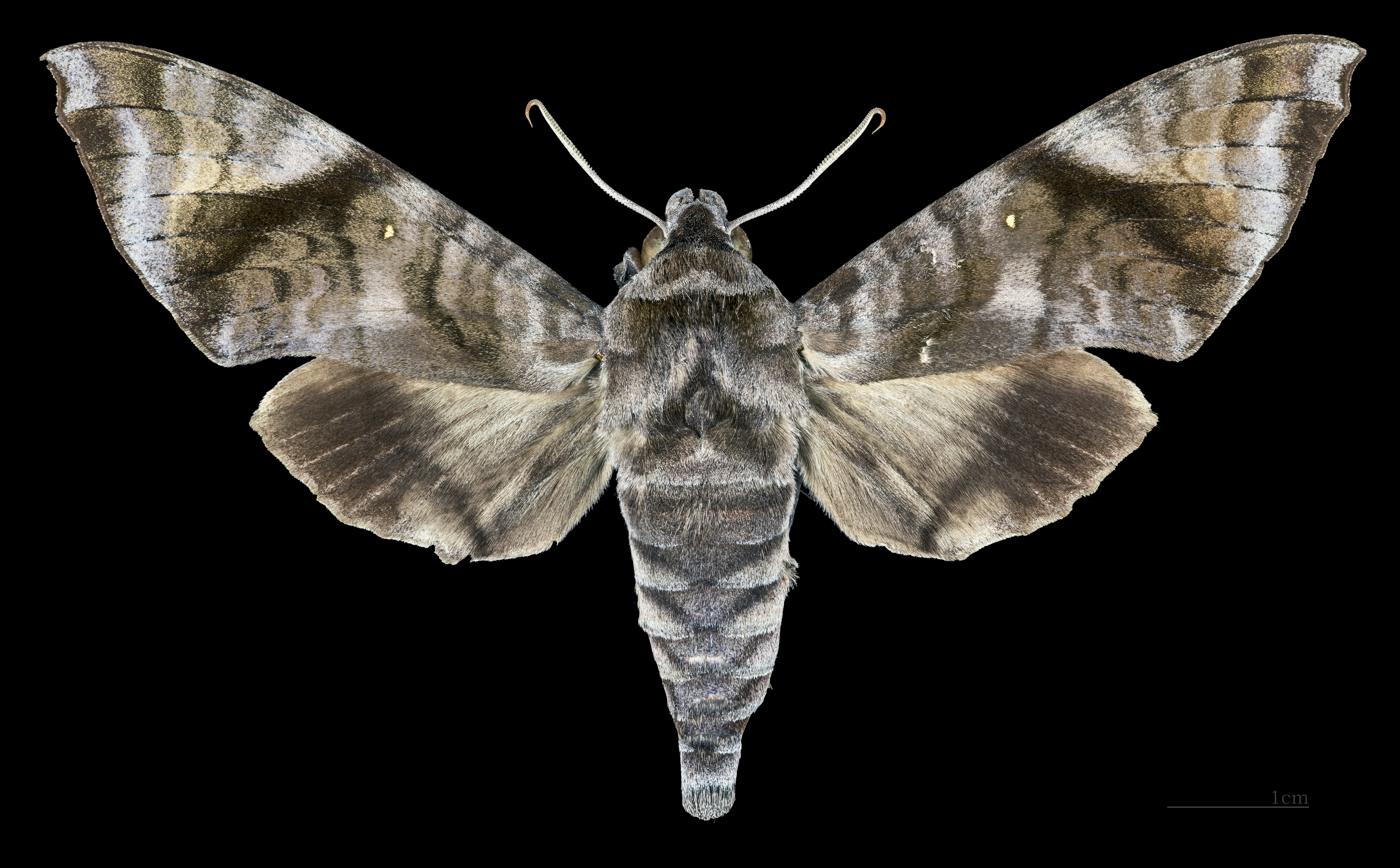
Female

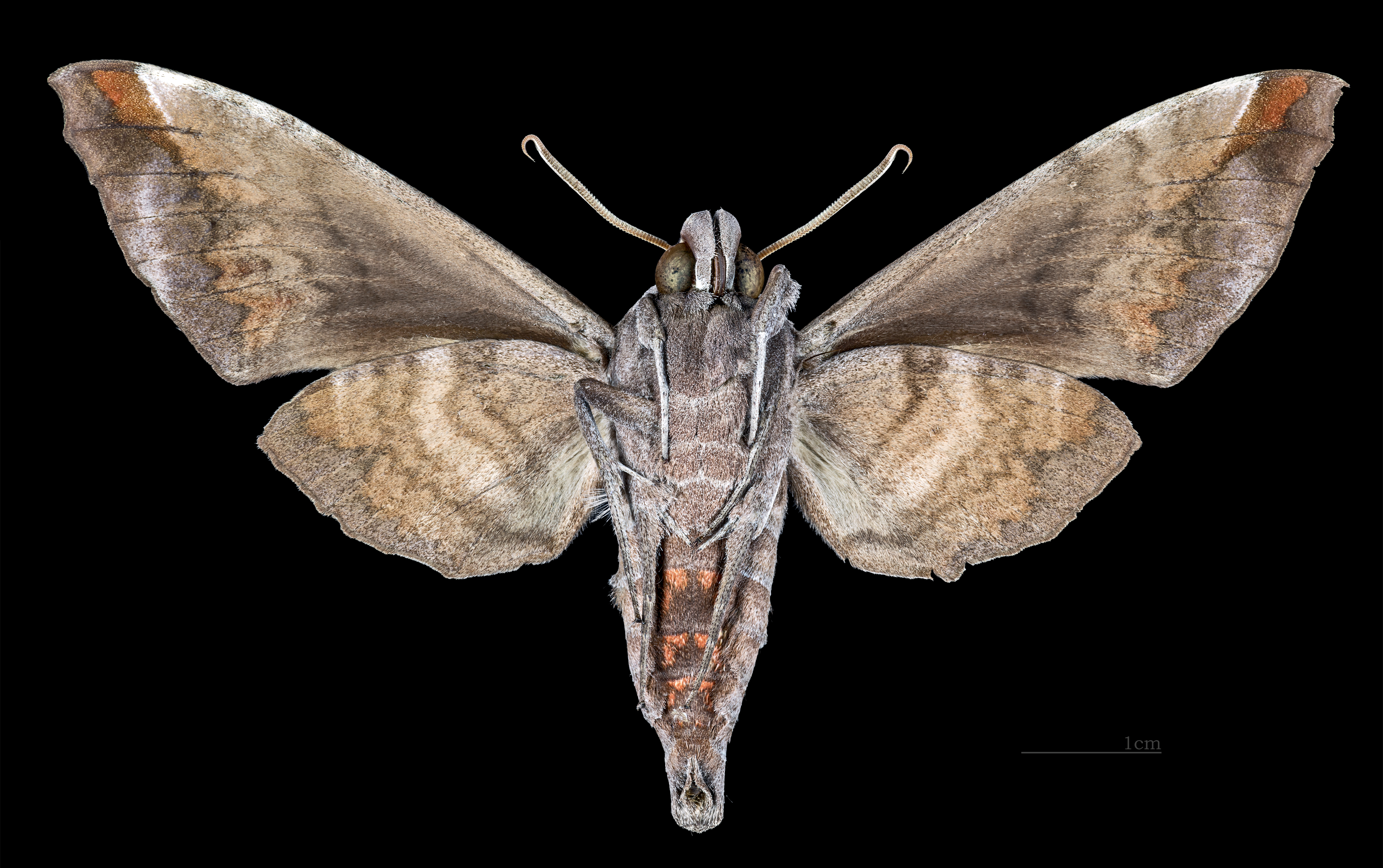
Female underside
