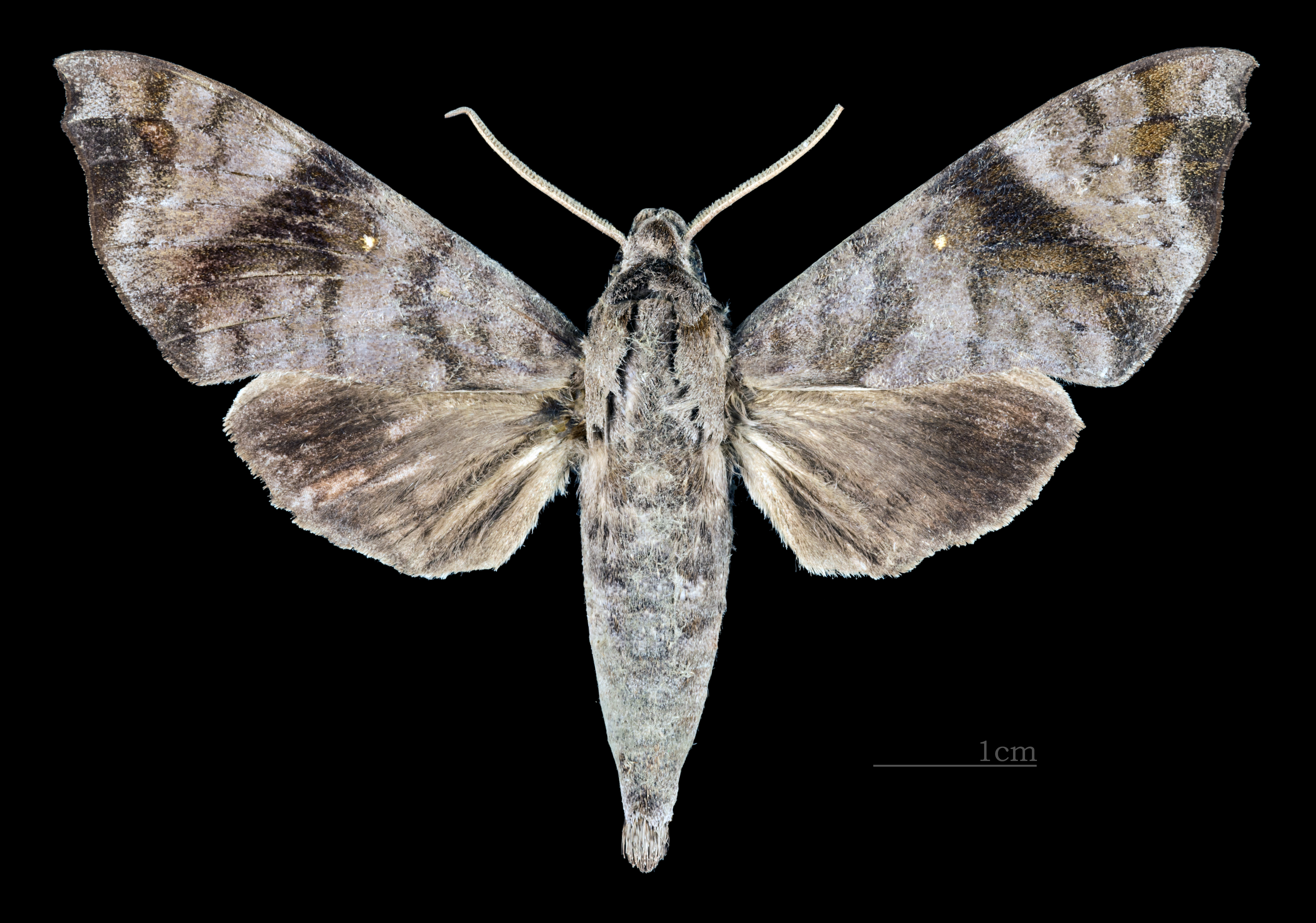
- Acosmeryx socrates Male dorsal
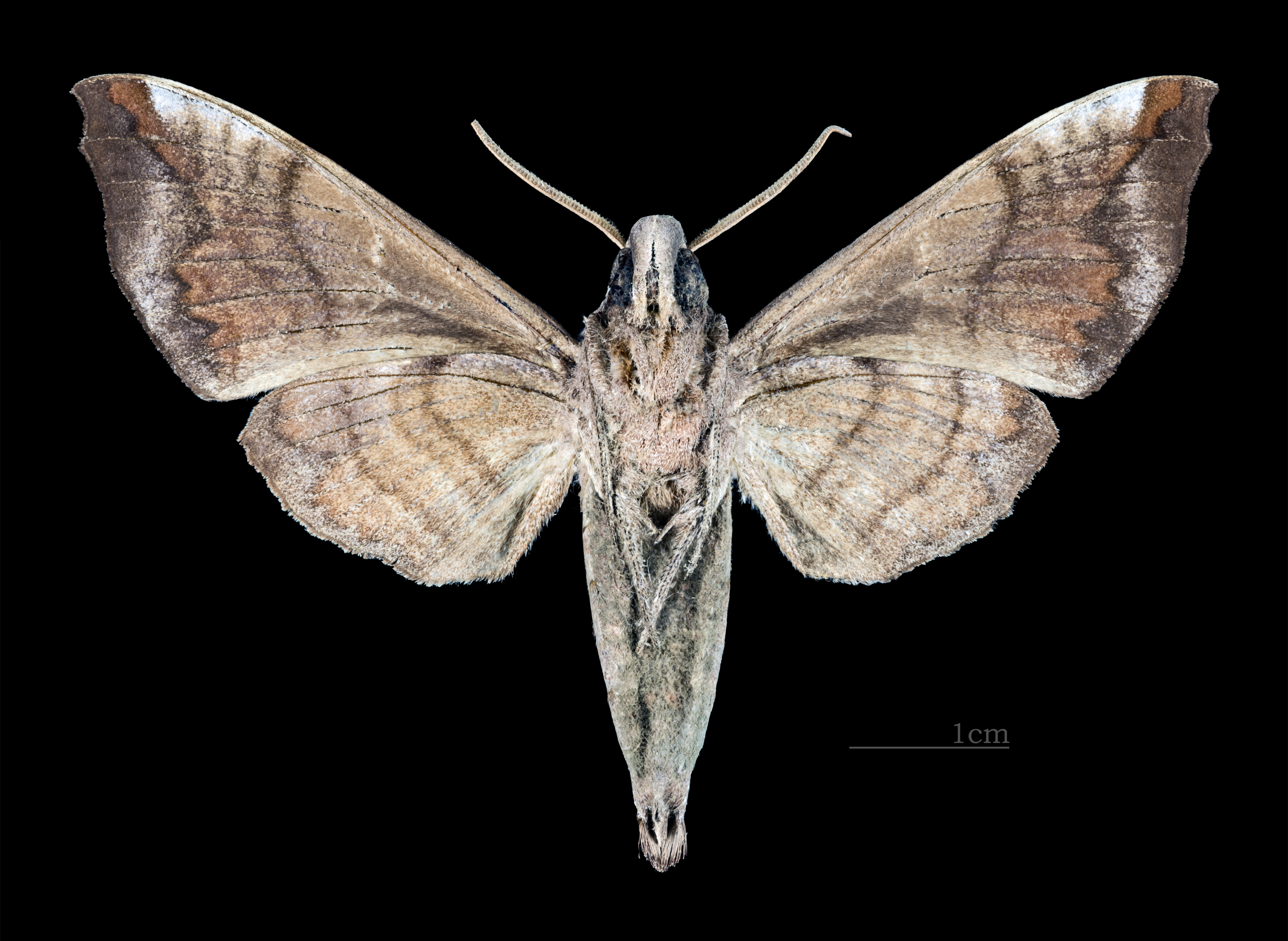
- Acosmeryx socrates Male ventral

Scientific classification
- Domain: Eukaryota
- Kingdom: Animalia
- Phylum: Arthropoda
- Class: Insecta
- Order: Lepidoptera
- Family: Sphingidae
- Genus: Acosmeryx
- Species: A. socrates

Binomial name
- Acosmeryx socrates Boisduval, 1875

= Acosmeryx socrates =

Species of moth

Acosmeryx socrates is a moth of the family Sphingidae. It is known from the Philippines.
