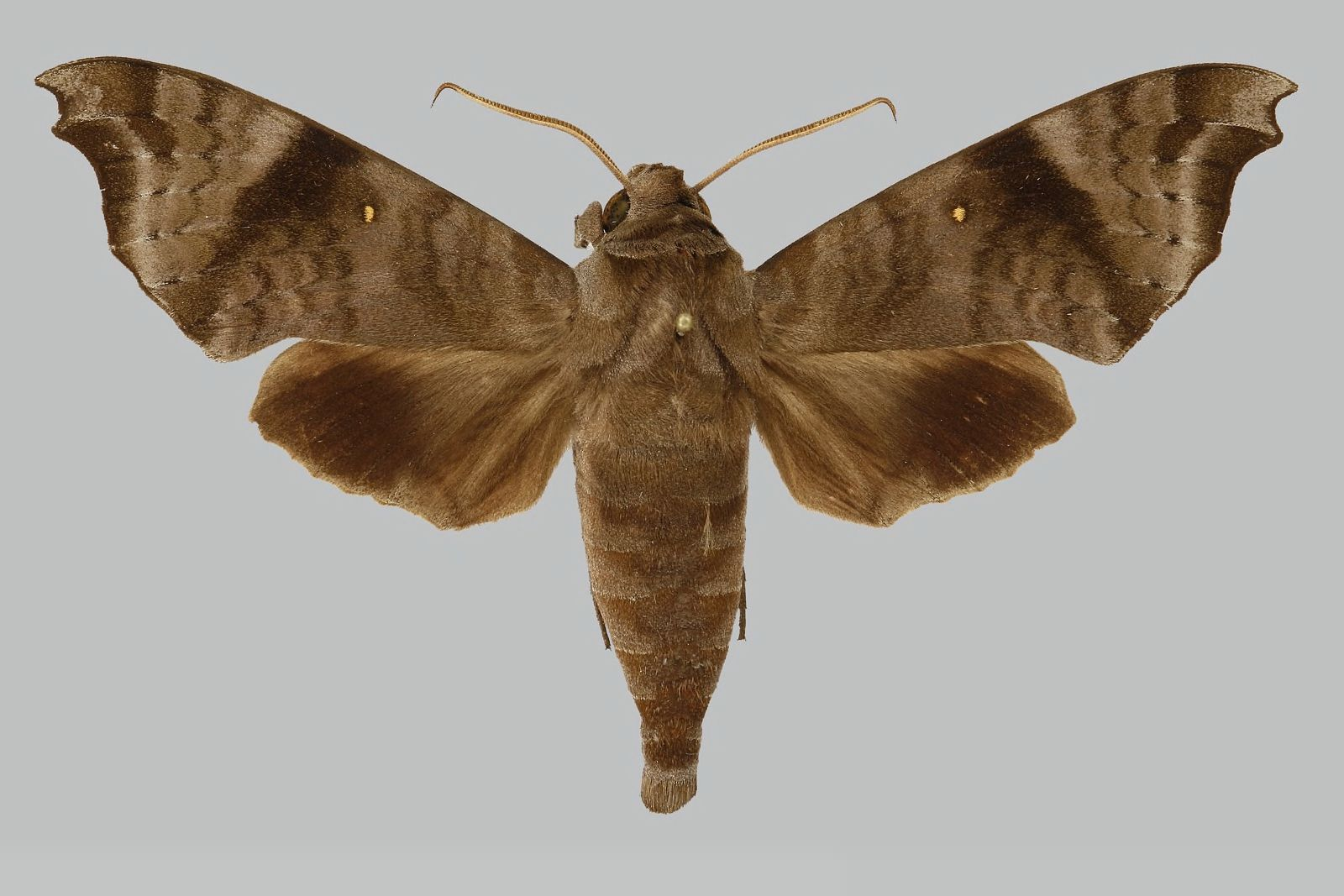
- male, upperside

Scientific classification
- Kingdom: Animalia
- Phylum: Arthropoda
- Clade: Pancrustacea
- Class: Insecta
- Order: Lepidoptera
- Family: Sphingidae
- Genus: Acosmeryx
- Species: A. tenggarensis

Binomial name
- Acosmeryx tenggarensis Brechlin & Kitching, 2007

= Acosmeryx tenggarensis =

Species of moth

Acosmeryx tenggarensis is a moth of the family Sphingidae. It is known from the Moluccas.
