= Possum grape =

Possum grape is a common name for several fruit-bearing vines indigenous to North America.

Possum grape may refer to:

== Botany ==
- Ampelopsis cordata
- Cissus incisa
- Cissus verticillata
- Cissus trifoliata
- Vitis baileyana
- Vitis cinerea
- Vitis cordifolia
- Vitis vulpina

== Other uses ==
- Possum Grape, Arkansas
