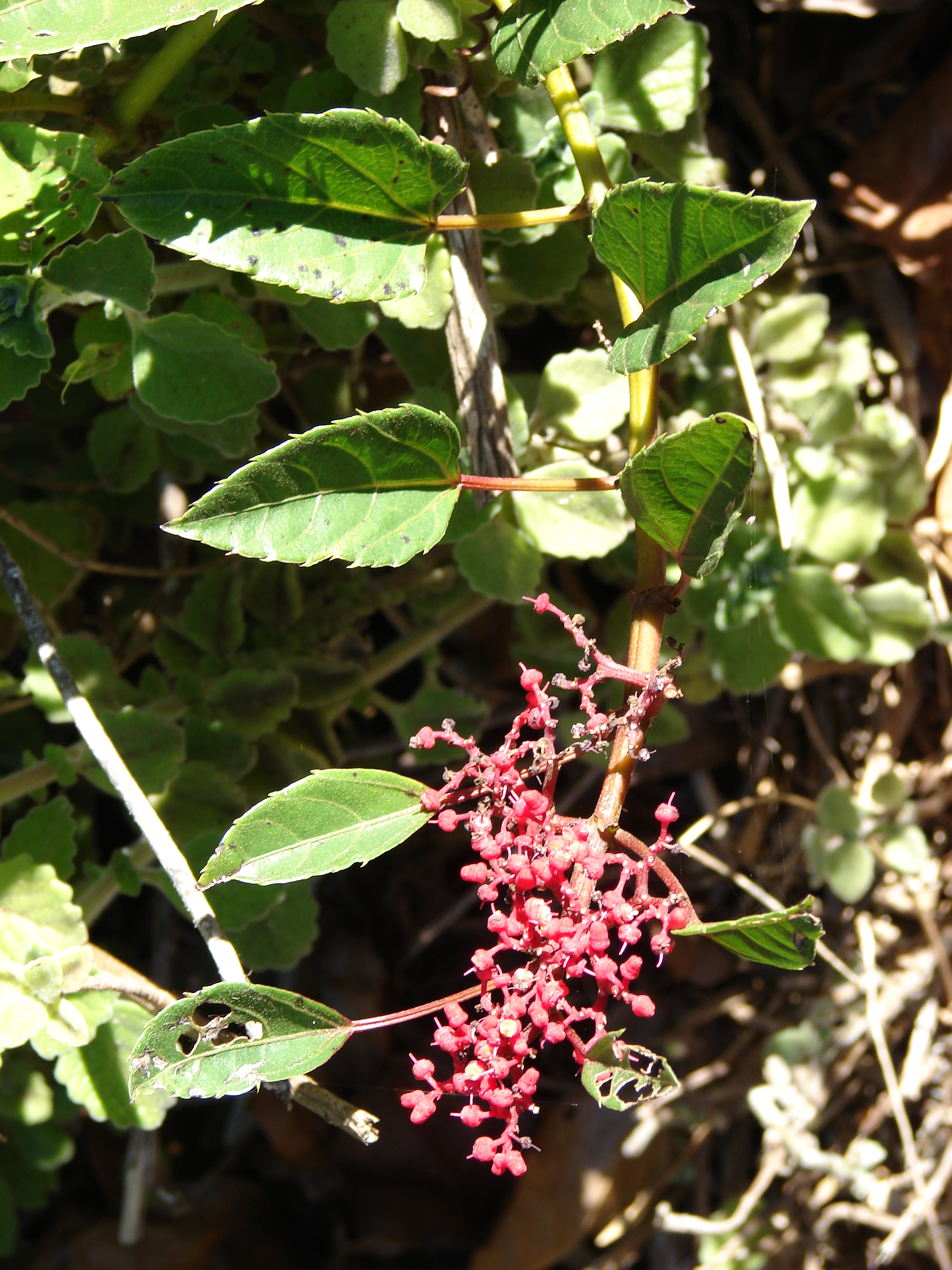
- Cissus nodosa

Scientific classification
- Kingdom: Plantae
- Clade: Tracheophytes
- Clade: Angiosperms
- Clade: Eudicots
- Clade: Rosids
- Order: Vitales
- Family: Vitaceae
- Tribe: Cisseae
- Genus: Cissus; L.

Species
- 279, see text

= Cissus =

Genus of grapevines

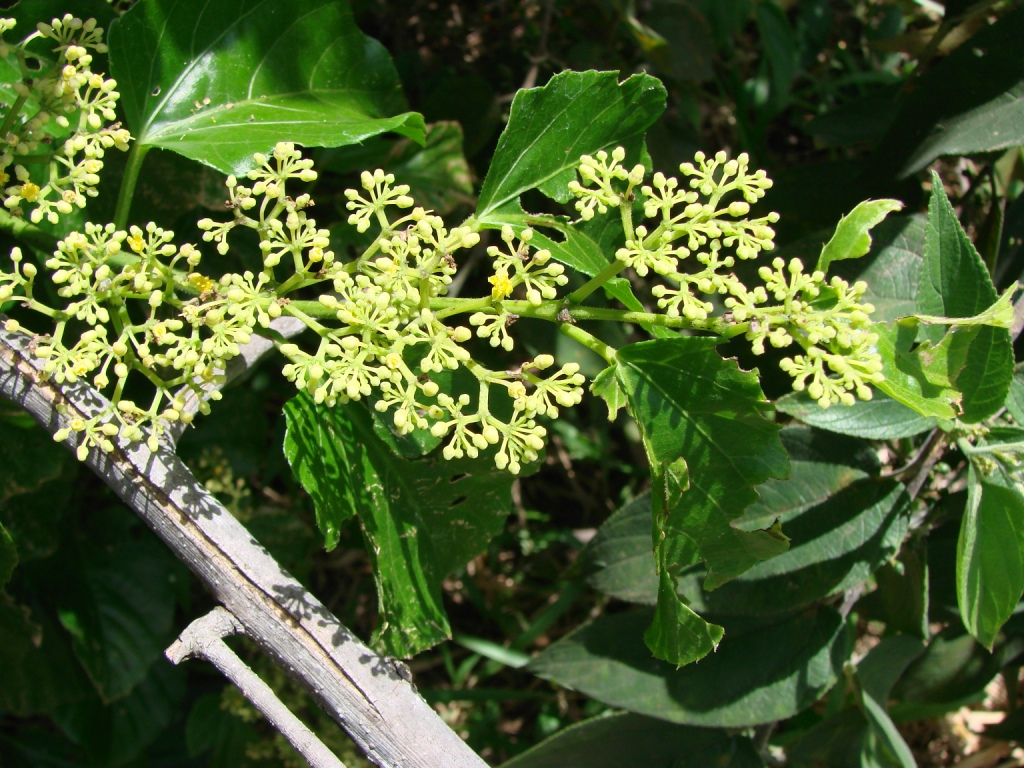
Cissus verticillata

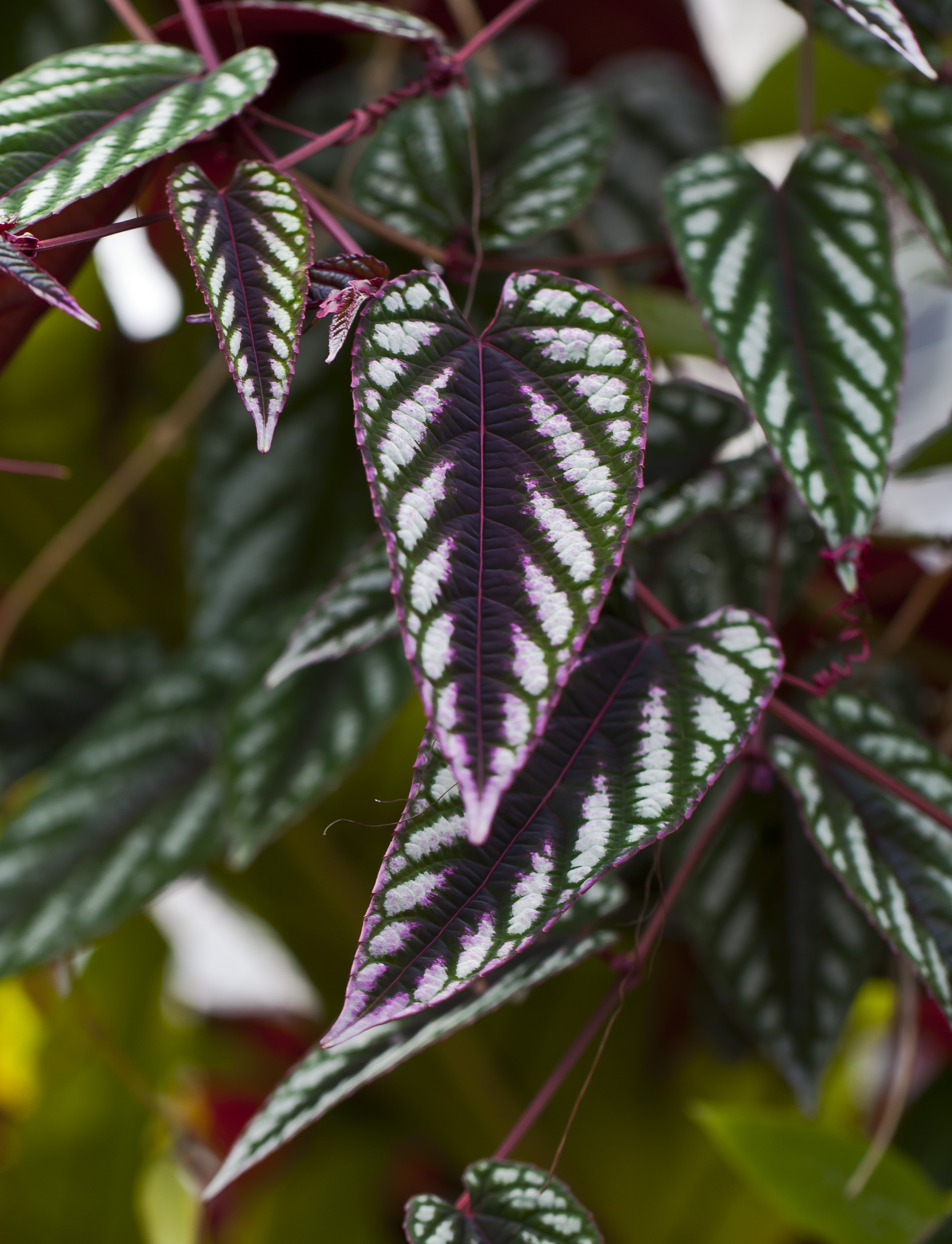
A Cissus discolor cultivar

Cissus is a genus of 350 species of lianas (woody vines) in the grape family (Vitaceae). Species are native to the tropical and subtropical Americas, sub-Saharan Africa, the Arabian Peninsula, tropical Asia, Papuasia, and Australia.

== Description ==
Extrafloral nectaries on the stipule have been reported for C. microcarpa, C. psudosicyoids, and C. rhombifolia.

== Uses ==
=== Medicinal ===
Cissus quadrangularis has been evaluated for potential medical uses. As a source of carotenoids, triterpenoids and ascorbic acid, the extracts may have potential for medical effects, including "gastroprotective activity" and benefits in terms of "lipid metabolism and oxidative stress". Cissus quinquangularis was used by the Maasai people of Kenya to relieve some of the symptoms of malaria.

=== Ornamental ===
Cissus alata and Cissus incisa are cultivated as garden plants in some areas of the world. Succulent members of the genus such as Cissus quadrangularis are also found in the nursery trade but tend to be frost tender and are thus not widely cultivated. Cissus alata is also cultivated as a houseplant, and C. discolor is often seen in greenhouses.

== Ecology ==
Cissus species are used as food plants by the larvae of some Lepidoptera species including Hypercompe eridanus and Hypercompe icasia. They are also consumed by chimpanzees.

== Taxonomy ==
The generic name is derived from the Greek word κισσος (kissos), meaning "ivy". In the 1980s the genus was split according to some details of the flower. The large caudiciform species were moved to the new genus Cyphostemma. In 2023 several Australasian and South American species were placed in the new genus Apocissus.

The genus name was established by Carl Linnaeus who used species epithets that are adjectives with feminine grammatical gender in Latin (e.g., C. trifoliata L.). This matches the pattern that names of trees ending in -us in Latin have feminine gender, although other plant names ending in -us are usually masculine.

== Species ==
Plants of the World Online currently includes:

- Cissus acreensis Lombardi
- Cissus adamii Detoit
- Cissus adeyana Masinde & L.E.Newton
- Cissus adnata Roxb.
- Cissus alata Jacq. – grape ivy
- Cissus albida Cambess.
- Cissus albiporcata Masinde & L.E.Newton
- Cissus amapaensis Lombardi
- Cissus ambongensis Desc.
- Cissus amoena Gilg & M.Brandt
- Cissus amplexicaulis Trias-Blasi & J.Parn.
- Cissus anemonifolia Zipp. ex Miq.
- Cissus angustata Ridl.
- Cissus anisophylla Lombardi
- Cissus annamica Gagnep.
- Cissus antandroy Desc.
- Cissus anulata Desc.
- Cissus apendiculata Lombardi
- Cissus aphylla Chiov.
- Cissus aphyllantha Gilg
- Cissus araguainensis Lombardi
- Cissus aralioides (Welw. ex Baker) Planch.
- Cissus arguta Hook.f.
- Cissus aristata Blume
- Cissus aristolochiifolia Planch.
- Cissus aristolochioides Planch.
- Cissus arnottiana B.V.Shetty & Par.Singh
- Cissus assamica (M.A.Lawson) Craib
- Cissus astrotricha Gagnep.
- Cissus aubertiana (Gage) P.Singh & B.V.Shetty
- Cissus auricoma Desc.
- Cissus austroyunnanensis Y.H.Li & Y.Zhang
- Cissus bachmaensis Gagnep.
- Cissus bahiensis Lombardi
- Cissus barbeyana De Wild. & T.Durand
- Cissus barteri (Baker) Planch.
- Cissus bathyrhakodes Werderm.
- Cissus bauerlenii Planch.
- Cissus bequaertii Detoit
- Cissus biformifolia Standl.
- Cissus blanchetiana Planch.
- Cissus boivinii Planch.
- Cissus bosseri Desc.
- Cissus bracteosa Lombardi
- Cissus brevipes C.V.Morton & Standl.
- Cissus cactiformis Gilg
- Cissus cacuminis Standl.
- Cissus caesia Afzel.
- Cissus calcicola Craib
- Cissus camiriensis Lombardi
- Cissus campestris (Baker) Planch.
- Cissus carrissoi Exell & Mendonça
- Cissus cerasiformis (Teijsm. & Binn.) Planch.
- Cissus coccinea (Baker) Mart. ex Planch.
- Cissus cochinchinensis Spreng.
- Cissus colombiensis Lombardi
- Cissus comosa Desc.
- Cissus compressiflora Lombardi
- Cissus conchigera Ridl.
- Cissus convolvulacea Planch.
- Cissus cornifolia (Baker) Planch.
- Cissus corylifolia (Baker) Planch.
- Cissus coursii Desc.
- Cissus craibii Gagnep.
- Cissus crusei Wild & R.B.Drumm.
- Cissus cucumerifolia Planch.
- Cissus cucurbitina Standl.
- Cissus cuspidata Planch.
- Cissus cussonioides Schinz
- Cissus darik Miq.
- Cissus dasyantha Gilg & M.Brandt
- Cissus dealbata Bedd.
- Cissus decaryi Wahlert & Phillipson
- Cissus decidua Lombardi
- Cissus descoingsii Lombardi
- Cissus dewevrei De Wild. & T.Durand
- Cissus dichotoma Blume
- Cissus diffusiflora (Baker) Planch.
- Cissus dinklagei Gilg & M.Brandt
- Cissus discolor Blume
- Cissus diversilobata C.A.Sm.
- Cissus doeringii Gilg & M.Brandt
- Cissus duarteana Cambess.
- Cissus duboisii Dewit
- Cissus egestosa Werderm.
- Cissus ellenbeckii Gilg & M.Brandt
- Cissus elmeri R.Kr.Singh & Sanjeet Kumar
- Cissus elongata Roxb.
- Cissus erecta S.H.Cho & Y.D.Kim
- Cissus erosa Rich. – caro de tres hojas
- Cissus evrardii Gagnep.
- Cissus fanshawei Wild & R.B.Drumm.
- Cissus farinosa Planch.
- Cissus faucicola Wild & R.B.Drumm.
- Cissus flavifolia Lombardi
- Cissus floribunda (Baker) Planch.
- Cissus forsteniana (Miq.) Planch.
- Cissus fragilis E.Mey. ex Harv.
- Cissus fuliginea Kunth
- Cissus furcifera Chiov.
- Cissus fusifolia Lombardi
- Cissus gambiana Desc.
- Cissus gardneri Thwaites
- Cissus glandulosa (Forssk. ex J.F.Gmel.) J.F.Gmel.
- Cissus glaucophylla Hook.f.
- Cissus glaucotricha Lombardi
- Cissus glossopetala (Baker) Suess.
- Cissus glyptocarpa Thwaites
- Cissus gongylodes (Baker) Burch. ex Baker – marble treevine
- Cissus gossweileri Exell & Mendonça
- Cissus gossypiifolia Standl.
- Cissus grisea (Baker) Planch.
- Cissus guerkeana (Büttner) T.Durand & Schinz
- Cissus haematantha Miq.
- Cissus hamaderohensis Radcl.-Sm.
- Cissus hastata Miq.
- Cissus heteroma Turcz.
- Cissus heterophylla Poir.
- Cissus heterotoma Turcz.
- Cissus hexangularis Thorel ex Planch.
- Cissus heyneana Steud.
- Cissus hookeri Ridl.
- Cissus humbertiana Desc.
- Cissus humbertii Robyns & Lawalrée
- Cissus integrifolia Planch.
- Cissus intermedia A.Rich.
- Cissus inundata (Baker) Planch.
- Cissus kerrii Craib
- Cissus koordersii (Backer) Amshoff
- Cissus kouandeensis A.Chev.
- Cissus kouilouensis Desc.
- Cissus lamprophylla Gilg & M.Brandt
- Cissus lanea Desc.
- Cissus latifolia Lam.
- Cissus lebrunii Dewit
- Cissus leemansii Dewit
- Cissus lemurica Desc.
- Cissus lenticellata (Baker) Suess.
- Cissus leonardii Dewit
- Cissus leucophlea (Scott Elliot) Suess.
- Cissus lombardiana Kottaim.
- Cissus lonchiphylla Thwaites
- Cissus longicymosa Lombardi
- Cissus louisii Detoit
- Cissus luzoniensis (Merr.) C.L.Li
- Cissus macrobotrys Turcz.
- Cissus macrophylla Jungh.
- Cissus madecassa Desc.
- Cissus marcanii Craib
- Cissus mauritiana Desc.
- Cissus mexicana Moc. & Sessé ex DC.
- Cissus microcarpa Vahl
- Cissus microdonta (Baker) Planch.
- Cissus miegei Tchoumé
- Cissus migeodii Verdc.
- Cissus milnei Verdc.
- Cissus mirabilis (Urb. & Ekman) Lombardi
- Cissus montana (Lauterb.) Jackes & Trias-Blasi
- Cissus morifolia Planch.
- Cissus muelleri Planch.
- Cissus narinensis Lombardi
- Cissus neei Croat
- Cissus nicaraguensis Lombardi
- Cissus nigropilosa Dewit
- Cissus nobilis Kuhlm.
- Cissus nodosa Blume
- Cissus notabilis Doweld
- Cissus nymphaeifolia (Welw. ex Baker) Planch.
- Cissus obliqua Ruiz & Pav.
- Cissus oblongifolia Merr.
- Cissus obovata Vahl
- Cissus oliveri (Engl.) Gilg ex Engl.
- Cissus oreophila Gilg & M.Brandt
- Cissus osaensis Lombardi
- Cissus oxyodonta (Baker) Desc.
- Cissus palmata Poir.
- Cissus palmatifida (Baker) Planch.
- Cissus paniculata (Balf.f.) Planch.
- Cissus paraensis Lombardi
- Cissus parviflora Schult. & Schult.f.
- Cissus patellicalyx Lombardi
- Cissus paucinervia Lombardi
- Cissus paullinifolia Vell.
- Cissus peltata Turcz.
- Cissus penninervis (F.Muell.) Planch.
- Cissus pentaclada Jackes
- Cissus pentagona Roxb.
- Cissus perrieri Desc.
- Cissus peruviana Lombardi
- Cissus petiolata Hook.f.
- Cissus phymatocarpa Masinde & L.E.Newton
- Cissus picardae Urb.
- Cissus pileata Desc.
- Cissus pingtungensis S.S.Ying
- Cissus pinnatifolia Lombardi
- Cissus planchoniana Gilg
- Cissus planchonii Gagnep.
- Cissus polita Desc.
- Cissus polyantha Gilg & M.Brandt
- Cissus populnea Guill. & Perr.
- Cissus producta Afzel.
- Cissus prunifera Desc.
- Cissus × pseudocaesia Gilg & M.Brandt
- Cissus pseudofuliginea Lombardi
- Cissus pseudoguerkeana Verdc.
- Cissus pseudopolyantha Mildbr.
- Cissus pseudoverticillata Lombardi
- Cissus pteroclada Hayata
- Cissus pubinervis Blume
- Cissus pulcherrima Vell.
- Cissus pynaertii De Wild.
- Cissus quadrangularis L.
- Cissus quadricornuta (Miq.) Hochr.
- Cissus quarrei Dewit
- Cissus quinquangularis Chiov.
- Cissus reniformis Domin
- Cissus repanda (Wight & Arn.) Vahl
- Cissus repens Lam.
- Cissus rhamnoidea Planch.
- Cissus rheifolia Planch.
- Cissus rhodotricha (Baker) Desc.
- Cissus robinsonii (Ridl.) Craib
- Cissus rondoensis Verdc.
- Cissus rostrata (Miq.) Korth. ex Planch.
- Cissus rotundifolia Vahl
- Cissus rubiginosa (Welw. ex Baker) Planch.
- Cissus rubropilosa Lombardi
- Cissus rufescens Guill. & Perr.
- Cissus ruginosicarpa Desc.
- Cissus ruspolii Gilg
- Cissus sagittifer Desc.
- Cissus salehi Lodé
- Cissus schmitzii Dewit
- Cissus sciaphila Gilg
- Cissus senegalensis Lavie
- Cissus serroniana (Glaz.) Lombardi
- Cissus serrulatifolia L.O.Williams
- Cissus silvestris Tchoumé
- Cissus smithiana (Baker) Planch.
- Cissus spinosa Cambess.
- Cissus stipulata Vell.
- Cissus subaphylla (Balf.f.) Planch.
- Cissus suberecta Bedd.
- Cissus subhastata Gagnep.
- Cissus subramanyamii B.V.Shetty & Par.Singh
- Cissus subrhomboidea (Baker) Planch.
- Cissus sue Gilg & M.Brandt
- Cissus sulcicaulis (Baker) Planch.
- Cissus sulfurosa Desc.
- Cissus sumatrana Latiff
- Cissus surinamensis Desc.
- Cissus sylvicola Masinde & L.E.Newton
- Cissus terengganuensis Latiff
- Cissus teysmannii Miq.
- Cissus tiliacea Kunth
- Cissus tiliiformis Desc.
- Cissus tinctoria Mart.
- Cissus touraensis A.Chev.
- Cissus trifoliata (L.) L.
- Cissus trigona Willd.
- Cissus triloba (Lour.) Merr.
- Cissus triternata Miq.
- Cissus trothae Gilg & M.Brandt
- Cissus ursina Lombardi
- Cissus uvifer Afzel.
- Cissus venezuelensis Steyerm.
- Cissus verticillata (L.) Nicolson & C.E.Jarvis – Seasonvine
- Cissus vinosa Jackes
- Cissus viridescens Ridl.
- Cissus vitiginea L.
- Cissus voanonala (Baker) Suess.
- Cissus wallacei Verdc.
- Cissus wellmanii Gilg & M.Brandt
- Cissus welwitschii (Baker) Planch.
- Cissus wenshanensis C.L.Li
- Cissus woodrowii (Stapf ex Cooke) Santapau
- Cissus wrightiana Planch.
- Cissus xavierensis Manickam, Murugan, Sundaresan, Jothi & Chellad.
- Cissus xerophila Lombardi
- Cissus youngii Exell & Mendonça
- Cissus zombitsy Desc.

=== Formerly placed here ===
- Ampelopsis glandulosa var. brevipedunculata (Maxim.) Momiy (as C. brevipedunculata Maxim.)
- Ampelopsis orientalis (Lam.) Planch. (as C. orientalis Lam.)
- Ampelopsis vitifolia Planch. (as C. vitifolia Boiss.)
- Apocissus acrantha (Lauterb.) Jackes & Trias-Blasi (as C. acrantha Lauterb.)
- Apocissus antarctica (Vent.) Jackes & Trias-Blasi (as C. antarctica Vent.)
- Apocissus behrmannii (Lauterb.) Jackes & Trias-Blasi (as C. behrmannii Lauterb.)
- Apocissus hypoglauca (A.Gray) Jackes & Trias-Blasi (as C. hypoglauca A.Gray)
- Apocissus oblonga (Benth.) Jackes & Trias-Blasi (as C. oblonga (Benth.) Planch.)
- Apocissus sterculiifolia (F.Muell. ex Benth.) Jackes & Trias-Blasi (as C. sterculiifolia (F.Muell. ex Benth.) Planch.)
- Apocissus trianae (Planch.) Jackes & Trias-Blasi (as C. trianae Planch.)
- Cayratia geniculata (Blume) Gagnep. (as C. geniculata Blume)
- Cayratia saponaria (Seem. ex Benth.) Domin (as C. saponaria (Seem. ex Benth.) Planch. or C. bicolor Domin)
- Cayratia trifolia (L.) Domin (as C. trifolia (L.) K.Schum.)
- Clematicissus opaca (F.Muell.) Jackes & Rossetto (as C. opaca F.Muell.)
- Cyphostemma bainesii (Hook.f.) Desc. (as C. bainesii (Hook.f.) Gilg & M.Brandt)
- Cyphostemma cirrhosum (Thunb.) Desc. (as C. cirrhosa (Thunb.) Willd.)
- Cyphostemma currorii (Hook.f.) Desc. (as C. currorii Hook.f. or C. crameriana Schinz)
- Cyphostemma juttae (Dinter & Gilg) Desc. (as C. juttae Dinter & Gilg)
- Rhoicissus tomentosa (Lam.) Wild & R.B.Drumm. (as C. capensis Willd. or C. tomentosa Lam.)
- Strychnos umbellata (Lour.) Merr. (as C. umbellata Lour.)
- Tetrastigma leucostaphylum (Dennst.) Alston ex Mabb. (as C. lanceolaria Roxb. or C. leucostaphyla Dennst.)
- Tetrastigma serrulatum (Roxb.) Planch. (as C. serrulata Roxb.)

== Image gallery ==
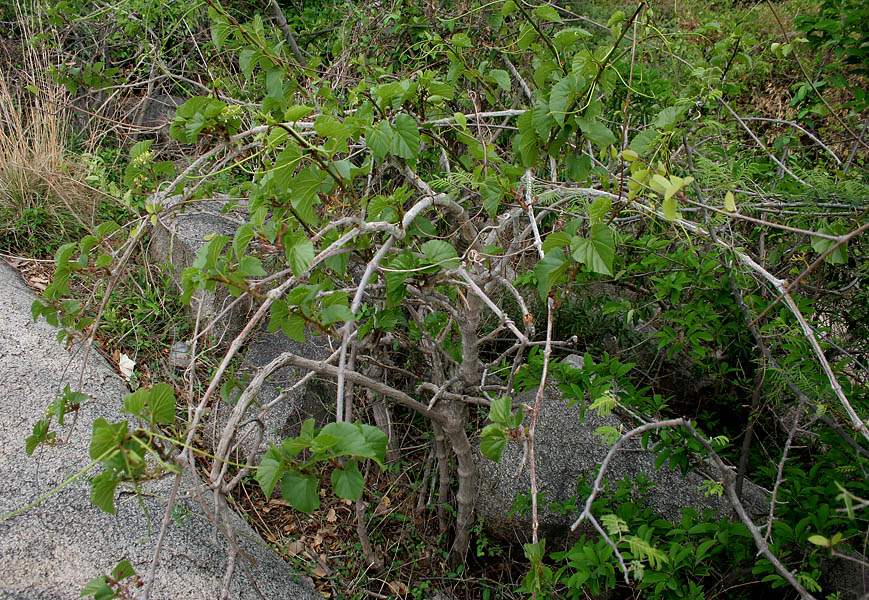
Cissus woodrowii in Keesara, Rangareddy district, Andhra Pradesh, India

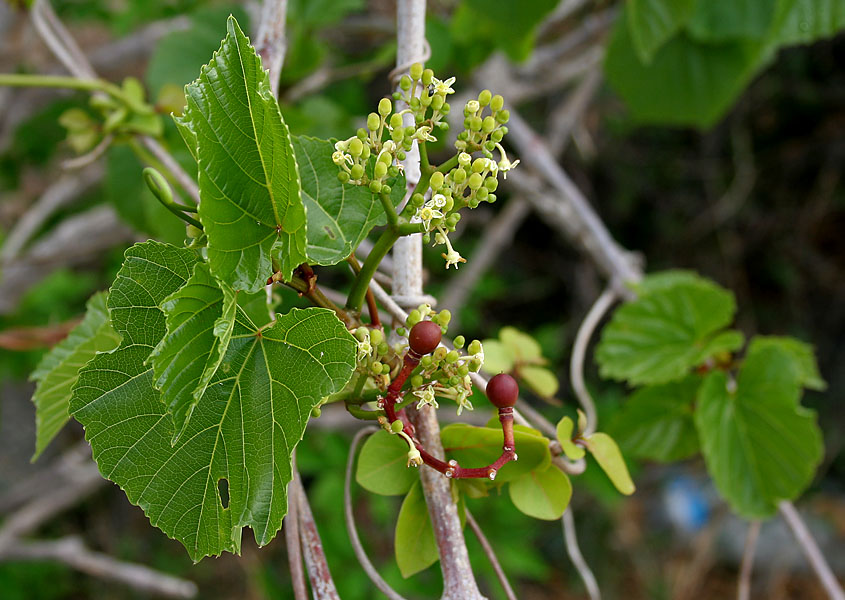
Cissus woodrowii in Keesara, India

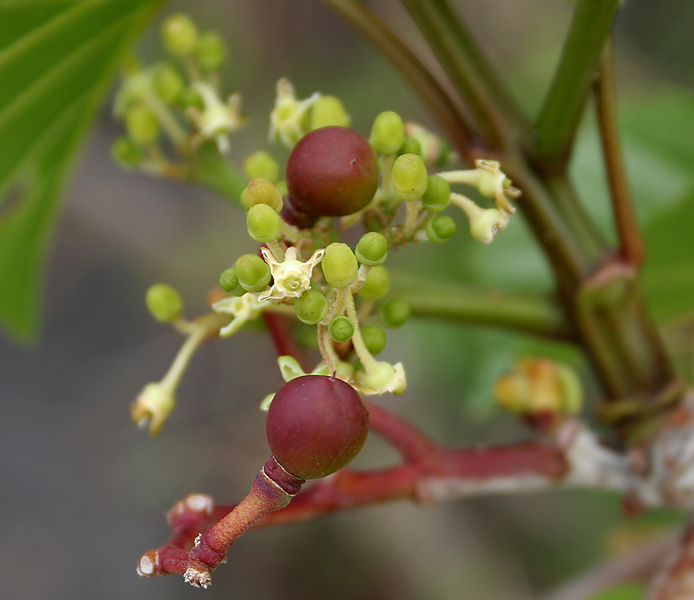
Cissus woodrowii in Keesara

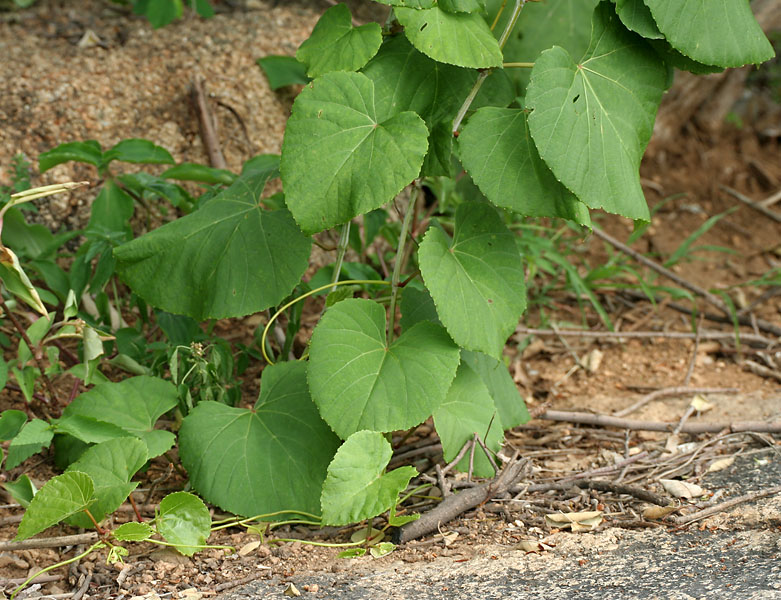
Cissus repanda in Keesara

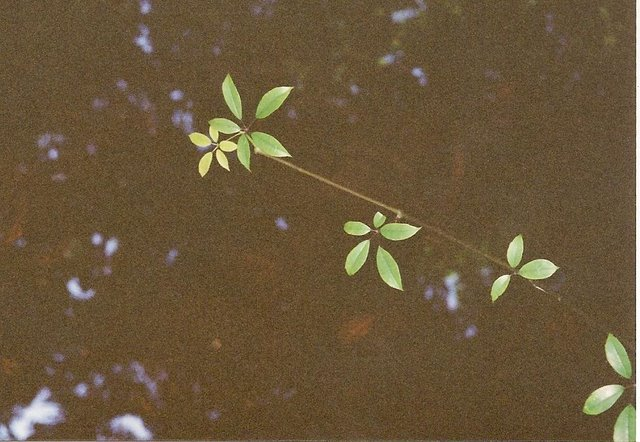
Cissus hypoglauca growing over a creek at Murramarang National Park, Australia
