= Wild onion dinner =

Native American dining celebration of the wild onion

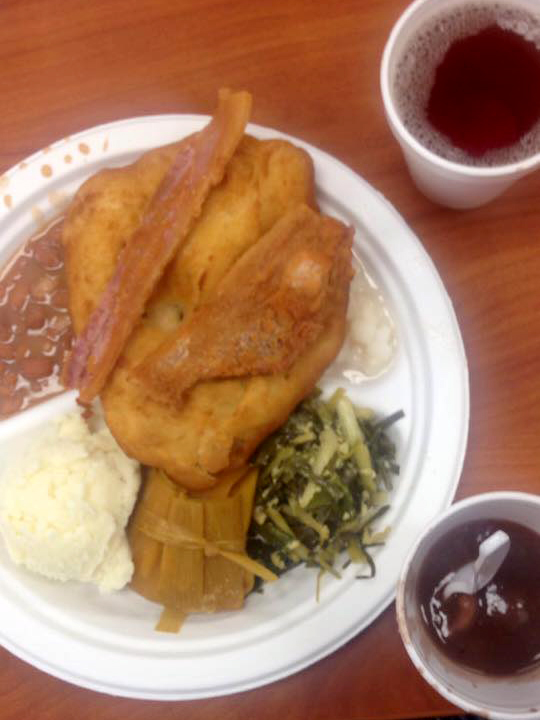
A serving at a Choctaw wild onion dinner (clockwise): beans, frybread, salt pork, iced tea, hominy, wild onions, grape dumplings, banaha (cornhusk bread), mashed potatoes

Wild onion dinners are social gatherings held in the spring by various Native American tribes in Oklahoma, especially southeastern tribes. The meals focus on the spring appearance of wild onion, a food that was familiar to most of the tribes east of the Mississippi.

"Wild onion" refers to several plant species but most commonly Allium vineale or Allium canadense. Allium tricoccum or ramps are a customary food in the eastern United States but not Oklahoma. Families often gather wild onions together from February to April. The plants can be found even in urban areas. Typically the wild onions are fried with scrambled eggs. Poke salad can be added.

Pork, frybread, and corn bread are popular side dishes. The typical dessert is grape dumplings, historically made from the juice of indigenous grapes, commonly called "possum grapes". Today the dumplings are often made from frozen grape juice and biscuit mix.

Many of these feasts are held by cultural clubs, Indian churches, and stompgrounds. They can include gospel sings or prayers in tribal languages. Stickball games are also common, a game that inspired the French adaptation of lacrosse.

A 1932 cookbook published by the Indian Women's Club of Tulsa suggests substituting scallions with one clove of garlic for wild onions, to be fried in bacon grease. The Bartlesville Indian Women's Club has held an annual wild onion festival for over half a century.

== See also ==
- List of dining events
