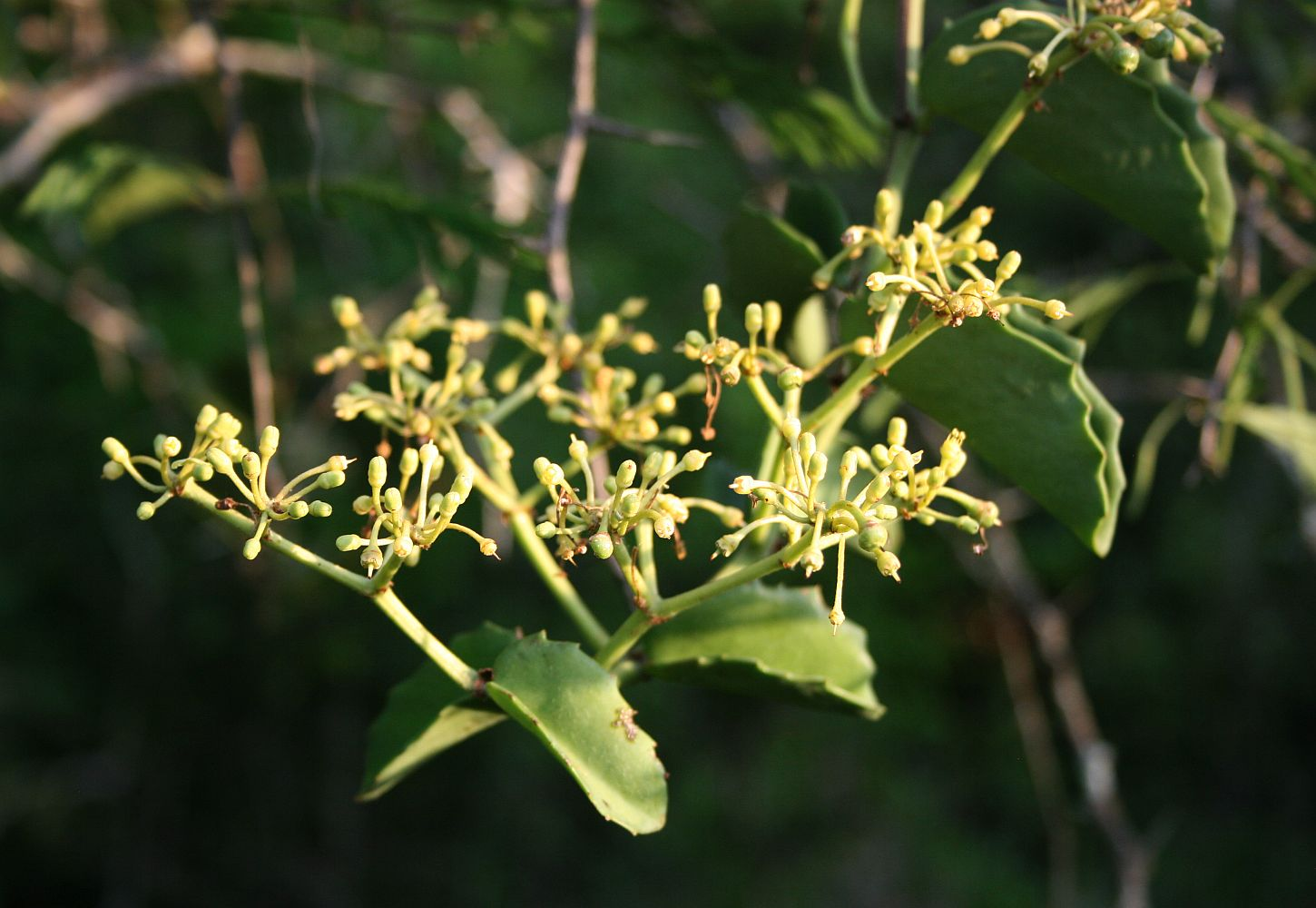

Scientific classification
- Kingdom: Plantae
- Clade: Tracheophytes
- Clade: Angiosperms
- Clade: Eudicots
- Clade: Rosids
- Order: Vitales
- Family: Vitaceae
- Genus: Cissus
- Species: C. rotundifolia

Binomial name
- Cissus rotundifolia Vahl

Synonyms
- Vitis forskahlii Blatt.; Vitis rotundifolia (Vahl) Deflers

= Cissus rotundifolia =

Species of plant

Cissus rotundifolia is a perennial, evergreen climber in the Vitaceae family.

== Distribution ==
The species is native to eastern Africa and the Middle East, and has been introduced to India, Hawaii, and the Seychelles.

== Cultivation and use ==
Cissus rotundifolia has been used in traditional medicine to treat burns, skin diseases, liver and gastrointestinal (GI) disorders.
