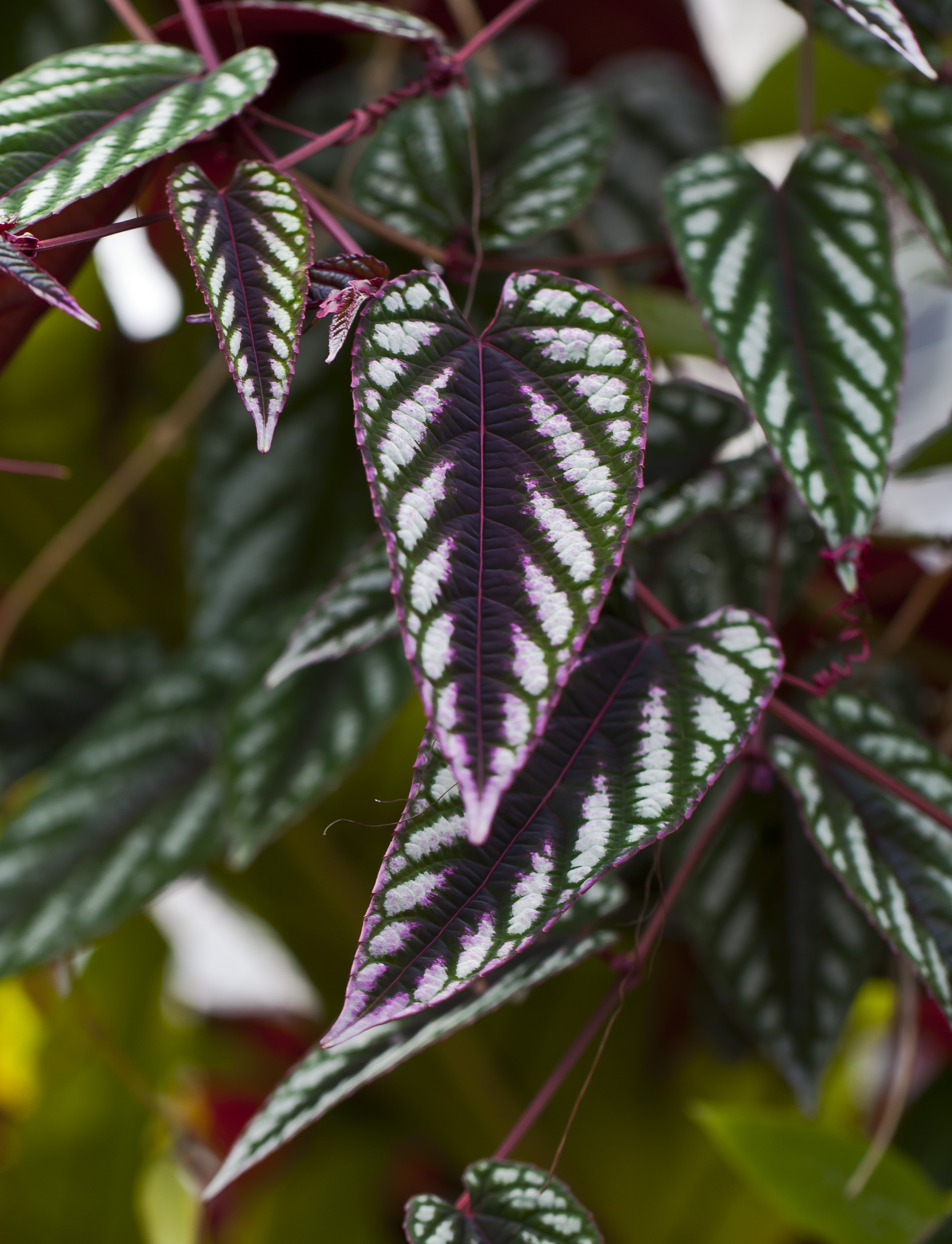
- Foliage
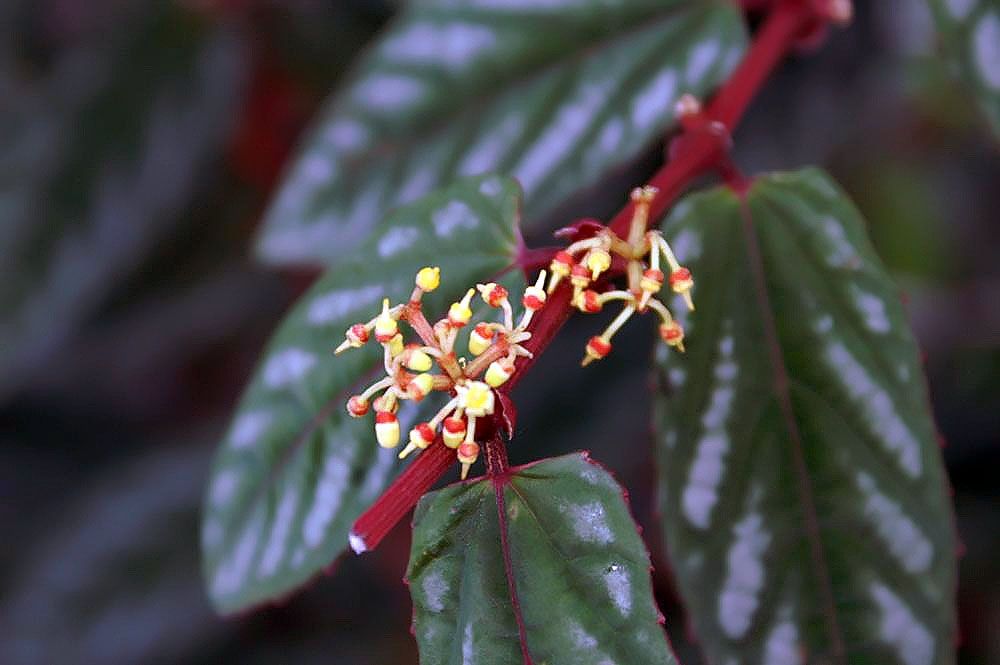
- Flowers at the United States Botanic Garden

Scientific classification
- Kingdom: Plantae
- Clade: Tracheophytes
- Clade: Angiosperms
- Clade: Eudicots
- Clade: Rosids
- Order: Vitales
- Family: Vitaceae
- Genus: Cissus
- Species: C. discolor

Binomial name
- Cissus discolor Blume

Synonyms
- Cissus discolor marmorata Jacob-Makoy; Cissus javana DC.; Cissus javana var. amplifolia Hochr.; Cissus marmorea G.Don; Cissus sessilis Amshoff; Cissus sicyoides Klein ex Steud.; Vitis bracteata Noronha; Vitis costata Wall.; Vitis discolor (Blume) Dalzell; Vitis diversifolia Wall.; Vitis inaequalis Wall.

= Cissus discolor =

Species of plant

Cissus discolor (syn. Cissus javana), the rex begonia vine, is a species of flowering plant in the family Vitaceae. It is found in tropical Asia; south-central China, Nepal, India, Bangladesh, Mainland Southeast Asia, Java, the Lesser Sunda Islands, and the Philippines at elevations of 600–2000 meters. It has been introduced to Trinidad and Tobago. A tender evergreen climber of slender habit, it typically reaches 2.5 m (8 ft), but is usually only 30 cm (1 ft) wide.

== Uses and cultivation ==
Leaves are edible, with young leaves eaten raw or cooked as a sour-tasting vegetable. Hardy to USDA Zone 11, it is recommended for hanging baskets, with the right mix of sun and shade required to bring out the color on the variegated leaves without scorching them.

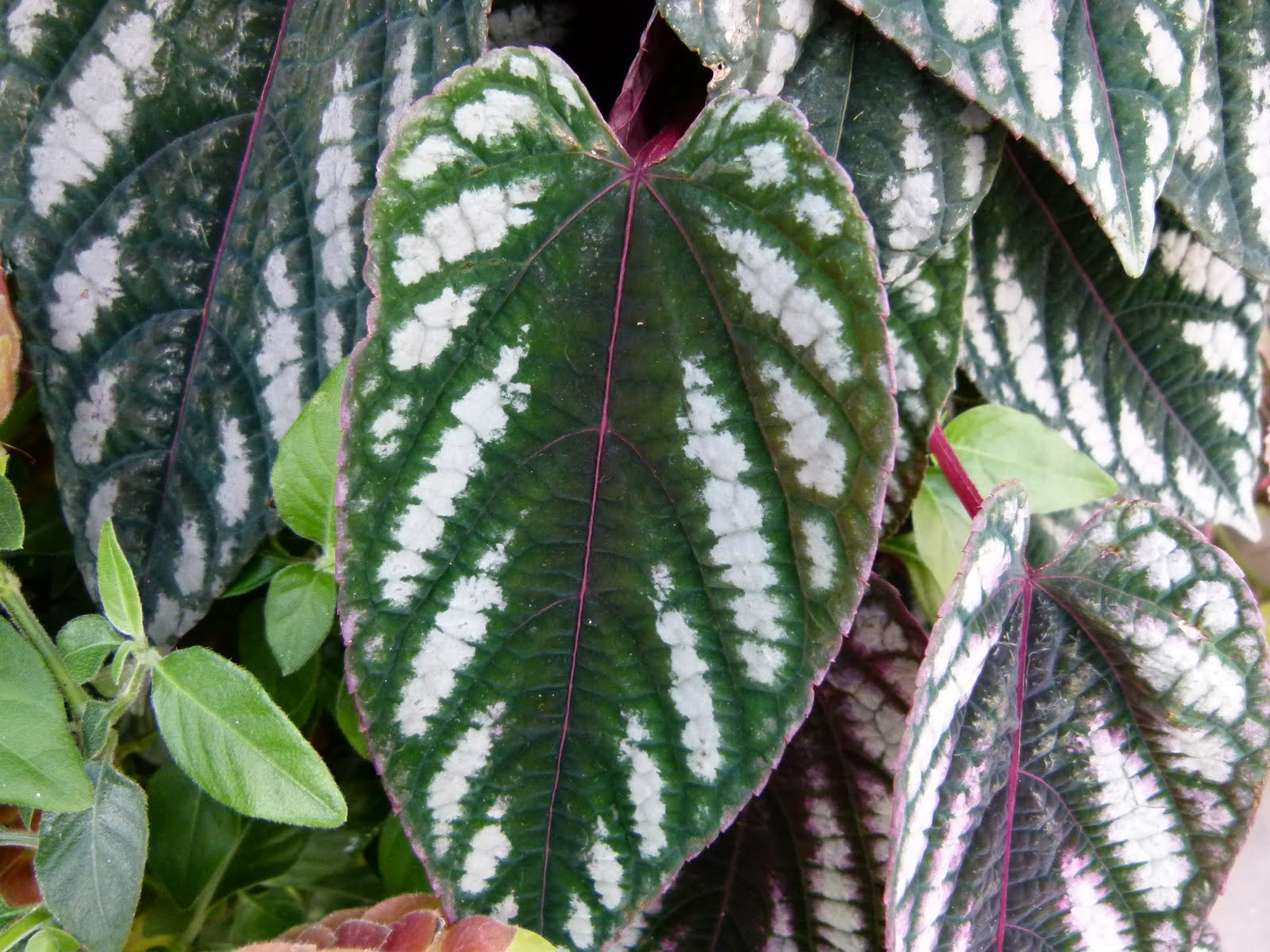
Close-up of leaves

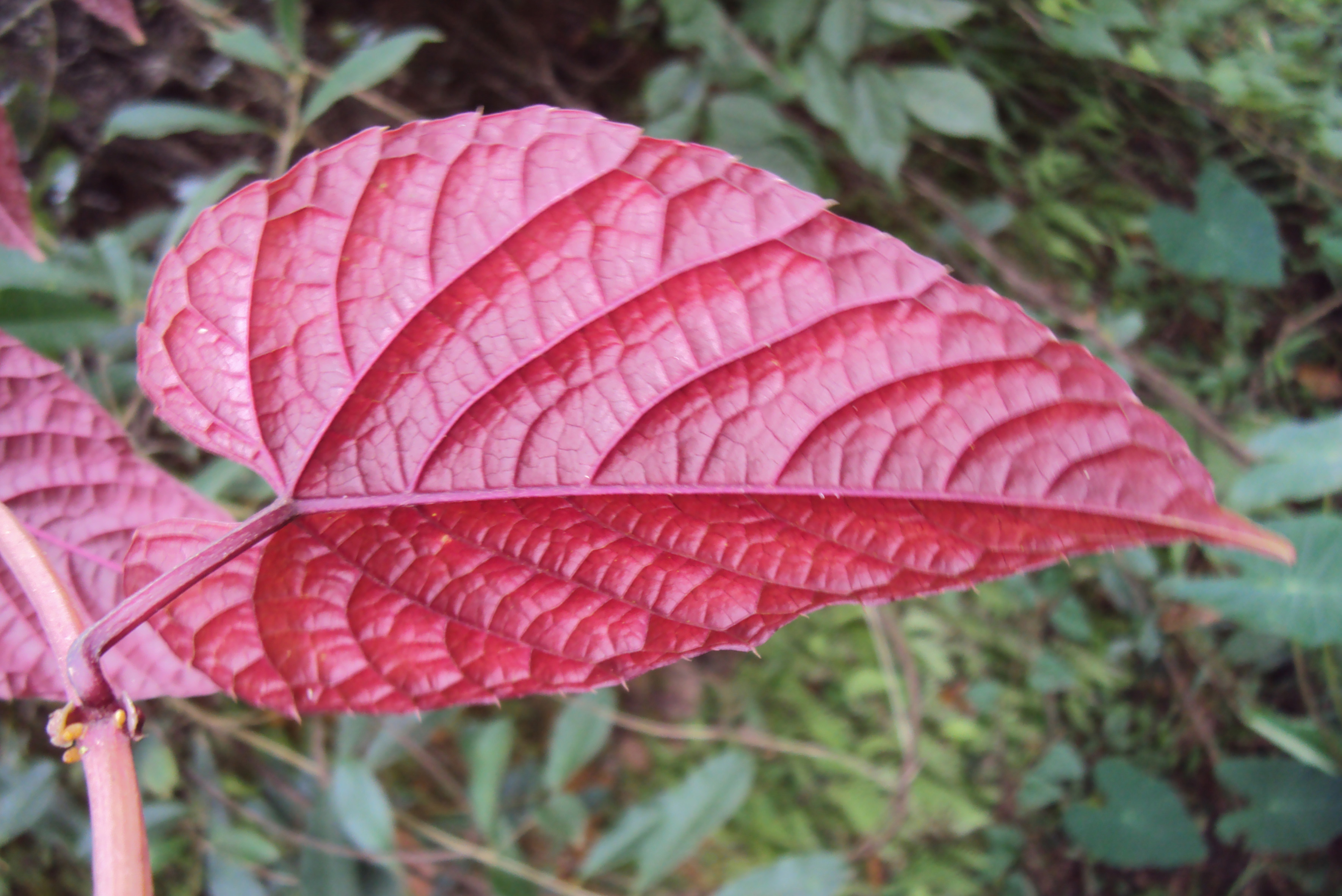
Underside of leaf

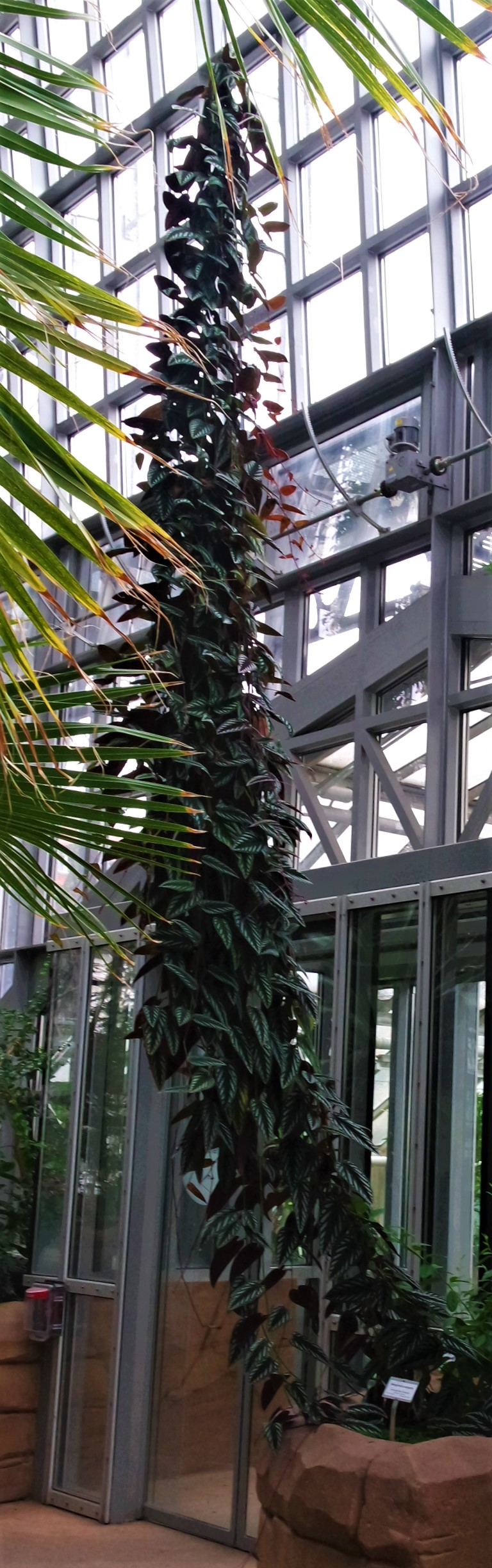
A large specimen

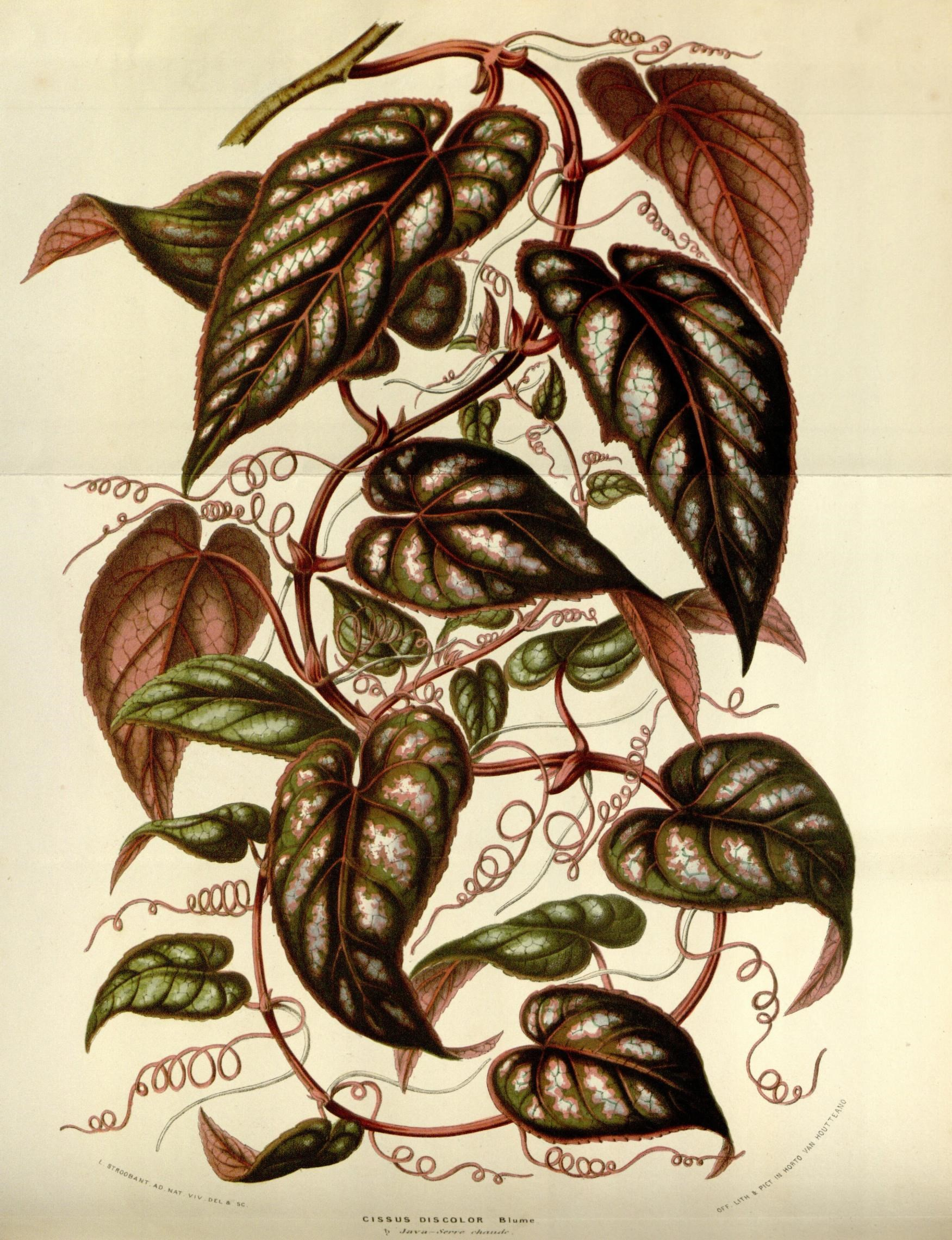
Botanical illustration

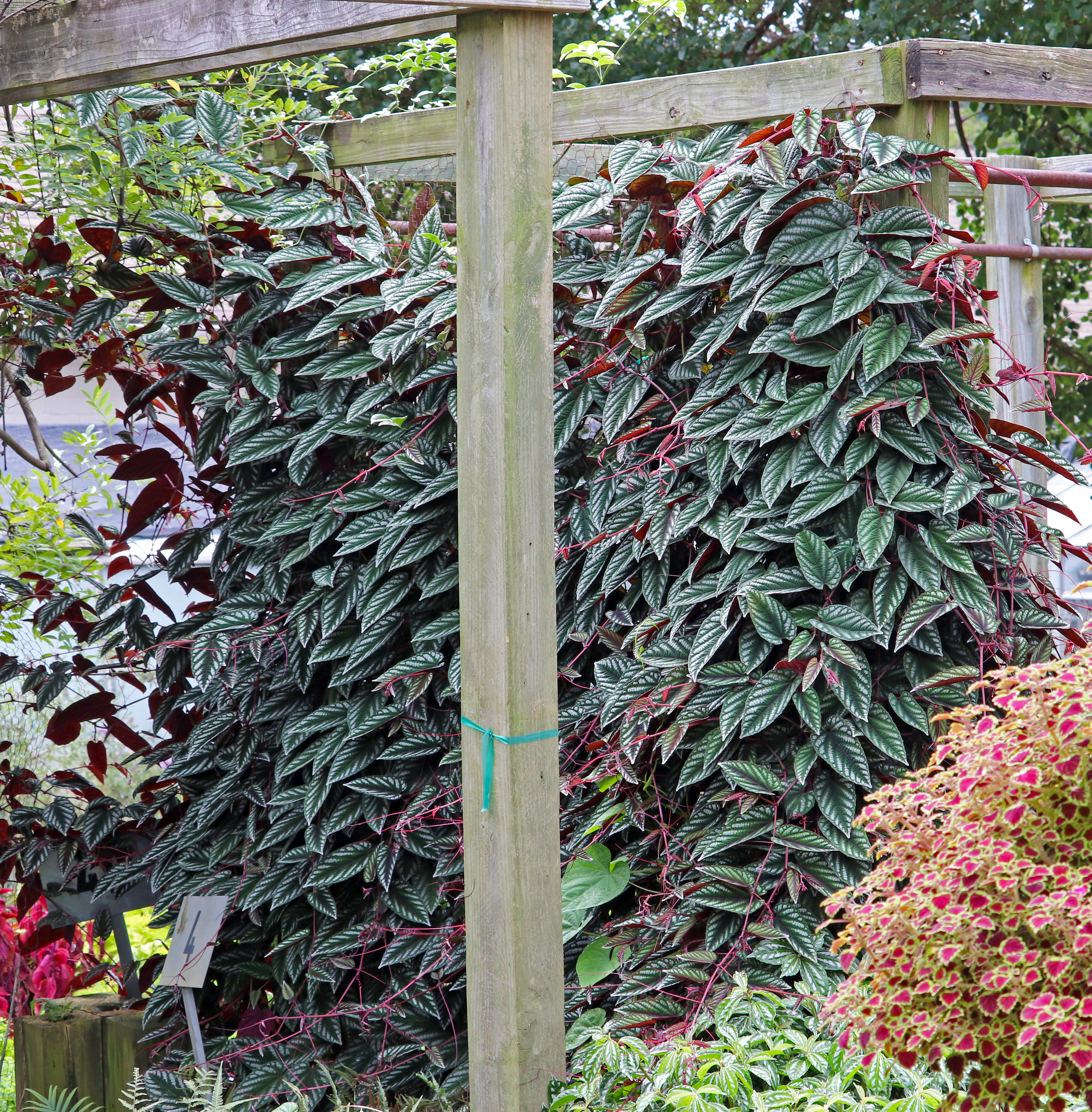
On a trellis

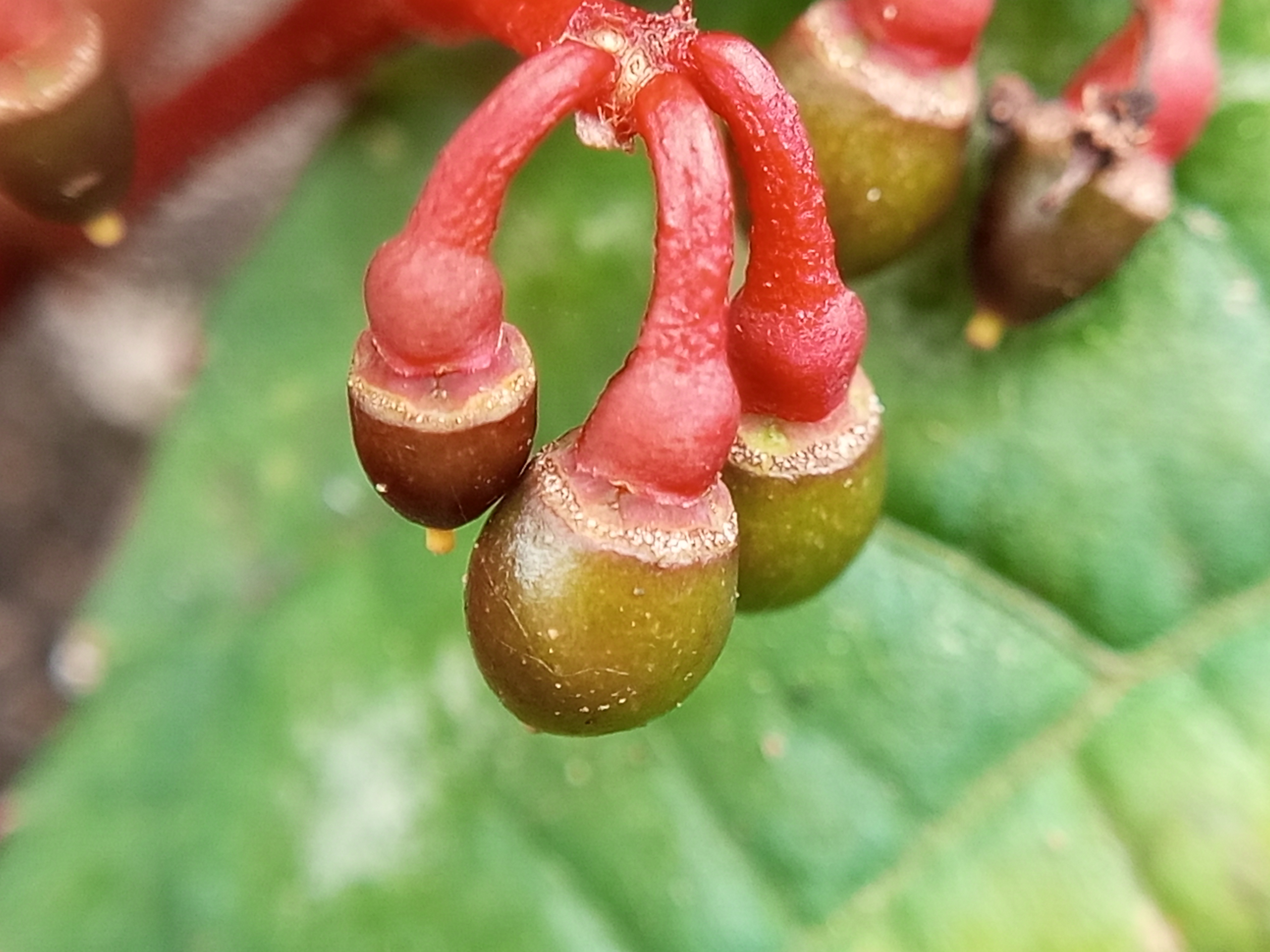
Fruit

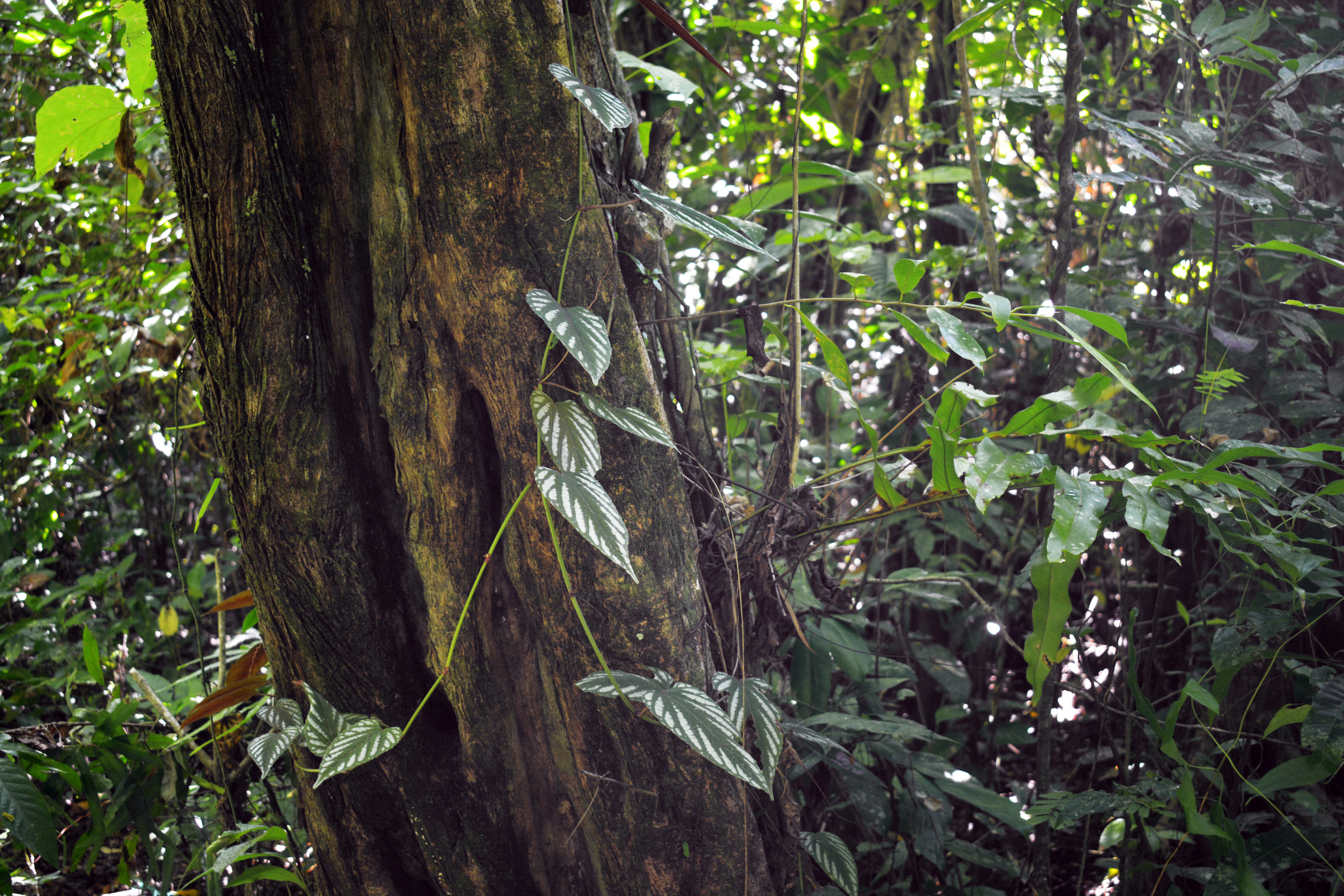
In the wild
