= Cissus tiliacea =

Scientific classification
- Kingdom: Plantae
- Clade: Tracheophytes
- Clade: Angiosperms
- Clade: Eudicots
- Clade: Rosids
- Order: Vitales
- Family: Vitaceae
- Genus: Cissus
- Species: C. tiliacea

Binomial name
- Cissus tiliacea Kunth

Synonyms
- Synonymy: Cissus arsenii Standl.; Cissus brevicaulis Gentry; Cissus pallidiflora Lundell; Cissus sicyoides f. tiliacea (Kunth) Planch.; Cissus sinaloae Standl.; Cissus subtruncata Rose; Cissus tuberosa Moc. & Sessé ex DC.; Vitis tiliacea (Kunth) Hemsl.; Vitis tuberosa (Moc. & Sessé ex DC.) Hemsl.

Species of vine

Cissus tiliacea is a species of the Cissus genus in the Vitaceae family. It is also incorrectly known as Vitis tuberosa.

== Distribution ==
This species is native to Puebla, Mexico, where it can be found in rocky outcrops at an elevation of 5000 feet.

== Description ==
Cissus tiliacea has a caudiciform stem that can grow up to ten inches in diameter and yards long with additional deciduous vines that can reach lengths of five yards or longer. During droughts, the vines die back leaving the caudex, which is normally mottled green and gray in color.

== Cultivation ==
This plant can tolerate high heat and full sun to light shade exposure. During the summer C. tiliacea should be watered regularly and drained well. During the winter months, when dormancy occurs, the plant requires much less water and should only be water once every two to four weeks to prevent excessive drying. Frost damage occurs at 28 °F so the plant should be maintained at a temperature above this, preferably in the 40-50 °F range. USA hardiness zones 9b-11 are recommended for best growth.
