= Possum Grape, Arkansas =

- Unincorporated community
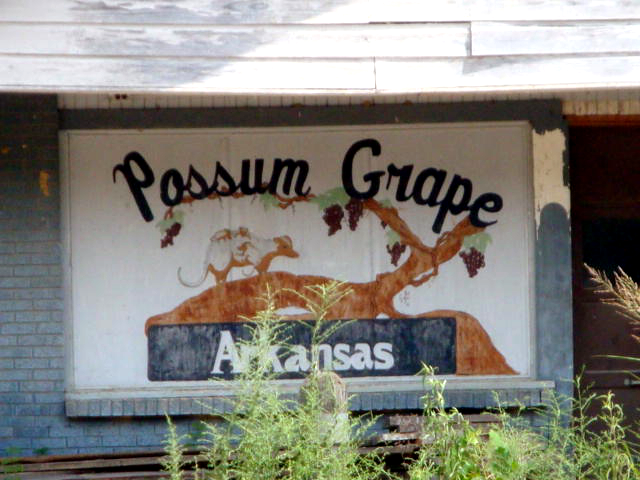

- Location within Arkansas Location within the United States
- Coordinates: 35°28′33″N 91°24′40″W
- Country: United States
- State: Arkansas
- County: Jackson
- Elevation: 243 ft (74 m)
- Time zone: UTC-6 (Central (CST))
  - Summer (DST): UTC-5 (CDT)
- GNIS feature ID: 58413

Possum Grape is an unincorporated community in Jackson County, Arkansas, United States. The community is on Arkansas Highway 367 between Bradford, Batesville, and Newport, near the White River.

The origin of the town's name is disputed. One explanation is that its name came from the possum grape, a type of wild grape found in the area. Another is that the name was chosen in 1954 as a compromise between conflicting groups of residents who called the community "Possum" and "Grape" respectively; however, local newspapers described the area as Possum Grape as early as 1929.
