= Cissus anisophylla =

Scientific classification
- Kingdom: Plantae
- Clade: Tracheophytes
- Clade: Angiosperms
- Clade: Eudicots
- Clade: Rosids
- Order: Vitales
- Family: Vitaceae
- Genus: Cissus
- Species: C. anisophylla

Binomial name
- Cissus anisophylla Lombardi

Species of plant

Cissus anisophylla is a plant species known from lowland rainforests of Panama, Colombia, Brazil, Peru, Costa Rica, Ecuador, and the Mexican state of Chiapas.

Cissus anisophylla is a liana climbing over other vegetation by means of branched tendrils. Stems are round in cross-section, hairless. Leaves are broadly ovate, up to 14 cm long and 10 cm across. Flowers are green, about 5 mm in diameter, borne in compound cymes up to 6 cm across, with minutely hairy peduncles.
