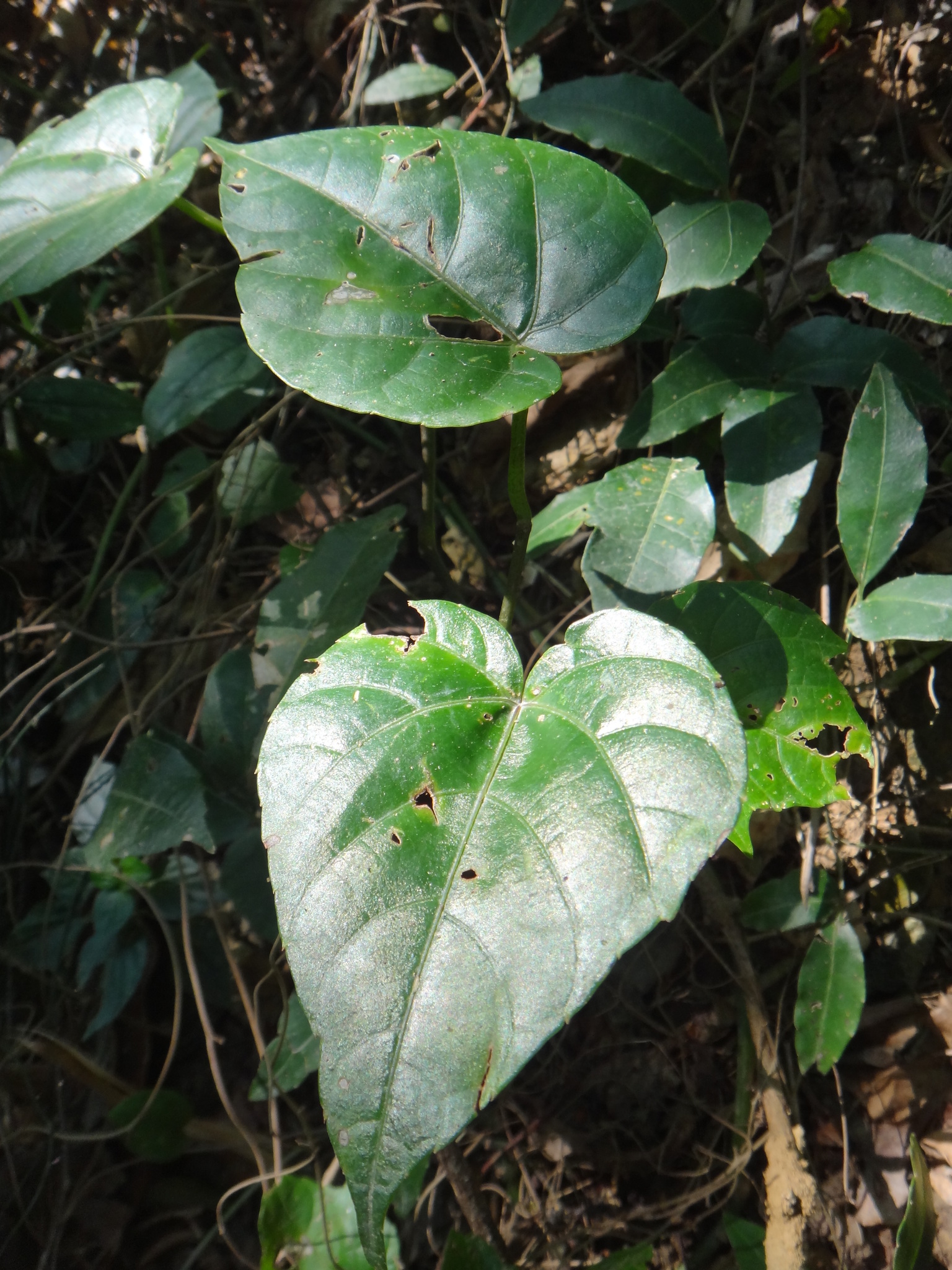
- Mature specimen with no visible fruits in Shoushanguojia Natural Park, Taiwan.
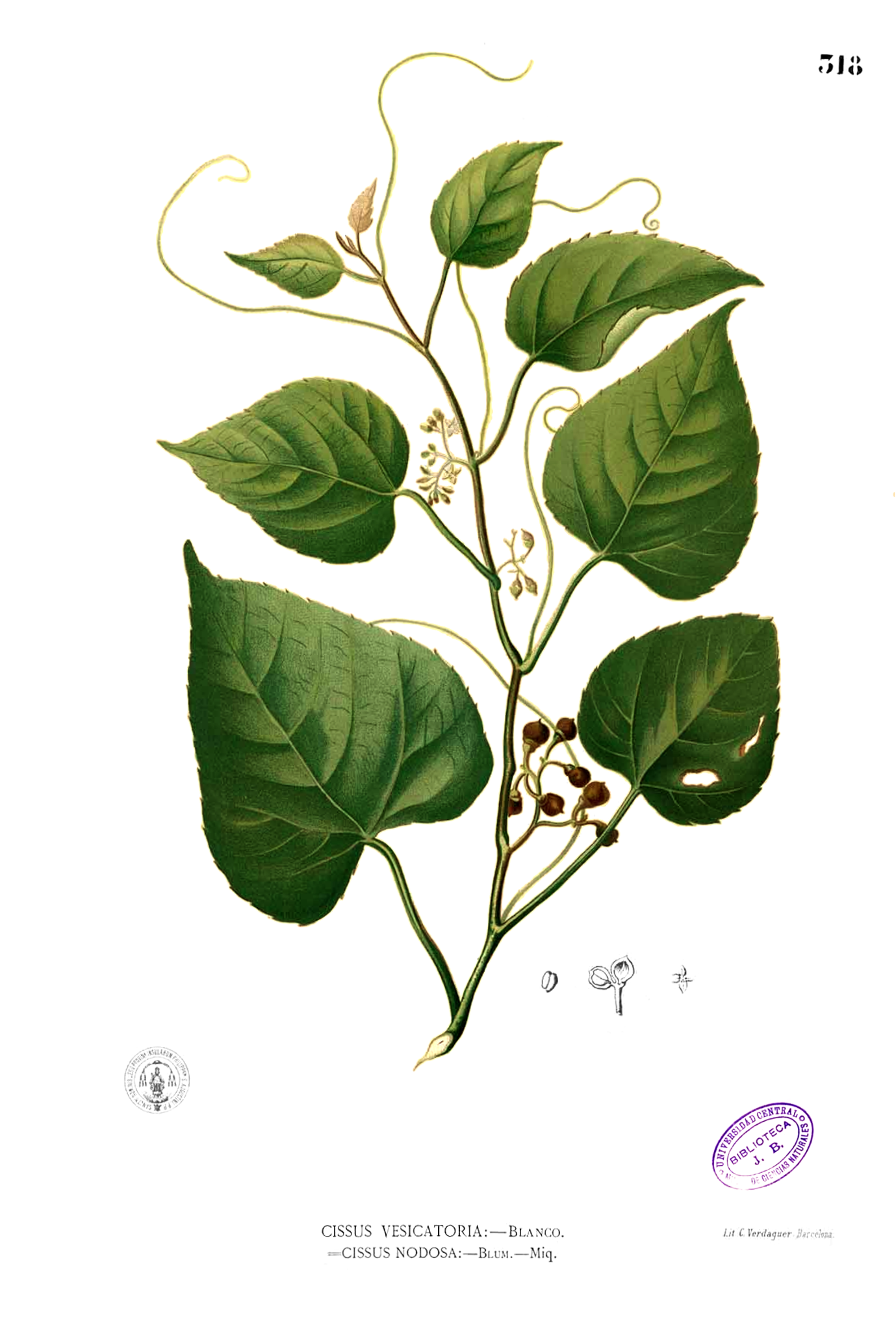
- Illustration of an example with fruits.

Scientific classification
- Kingdom: Plantae
- Clade: Tracheophytes
- Clade: Angiosperms
- Clade: Eudicots
- Clade: Rosids
- Order: Vitales
- Family: Vitaceae
- Genus: Cissus
- Species: C. repens

Binomial name
- Cissus repens Lam.

= Cissus repens =

Species of grapevine

Cissus repens is a species of tropical rainforest vine in the grape family. It is found in various parts of Asia including Malaysia. This vine is recorded as far south as Cape York Peninsula and the wet tropics region of north eastern Queensland, Australia. It has heart shaped leaves, near them on the stem is the tendril. The specific epithet repens is from the Latin, meaning “creeping”.
