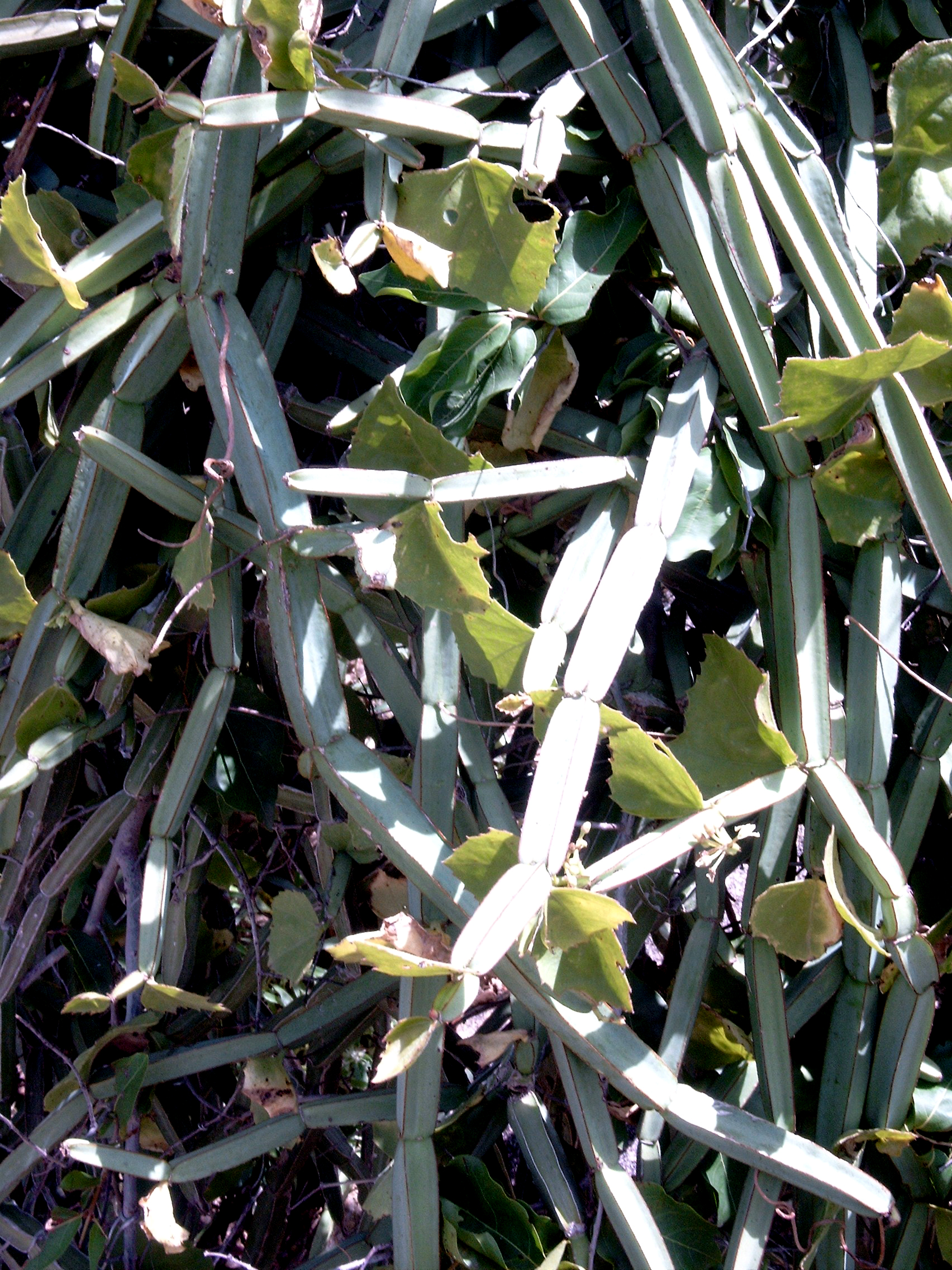

Scientific classification
- Kingdom: Plantae
- Clade: Tracheophytes
- Clade: Angiosperms
- Clade: Eudicots
- Clade: Rosids
- Order: Vitales
- Family: Vitaceae
- Genus: Cissus
- Species: C. quadrangularis

Binomial name
- Cissus quadrangularis L.

Synonyms
- Cissus bifida Schumach. & Thonn.; Cissus edulis Dalzell; Cissus fischeri Gilg; Cissus quadrangula L.; Cissus quadrangula Salisb.; Cissus succulenta (Galpin) Burtt-Davy; Cissus tetragona Harv.; Cissus tetraptera Hook.f.; Cissus triandra Schumach. & Thonn.; Vitis quadrangularis (L.) Wall. ex Wight; Vitis succulenta Galpin

= Cissus quadrangularis =

Species of grapevine

Flower of Cissus quadrangularis (Zoomed)

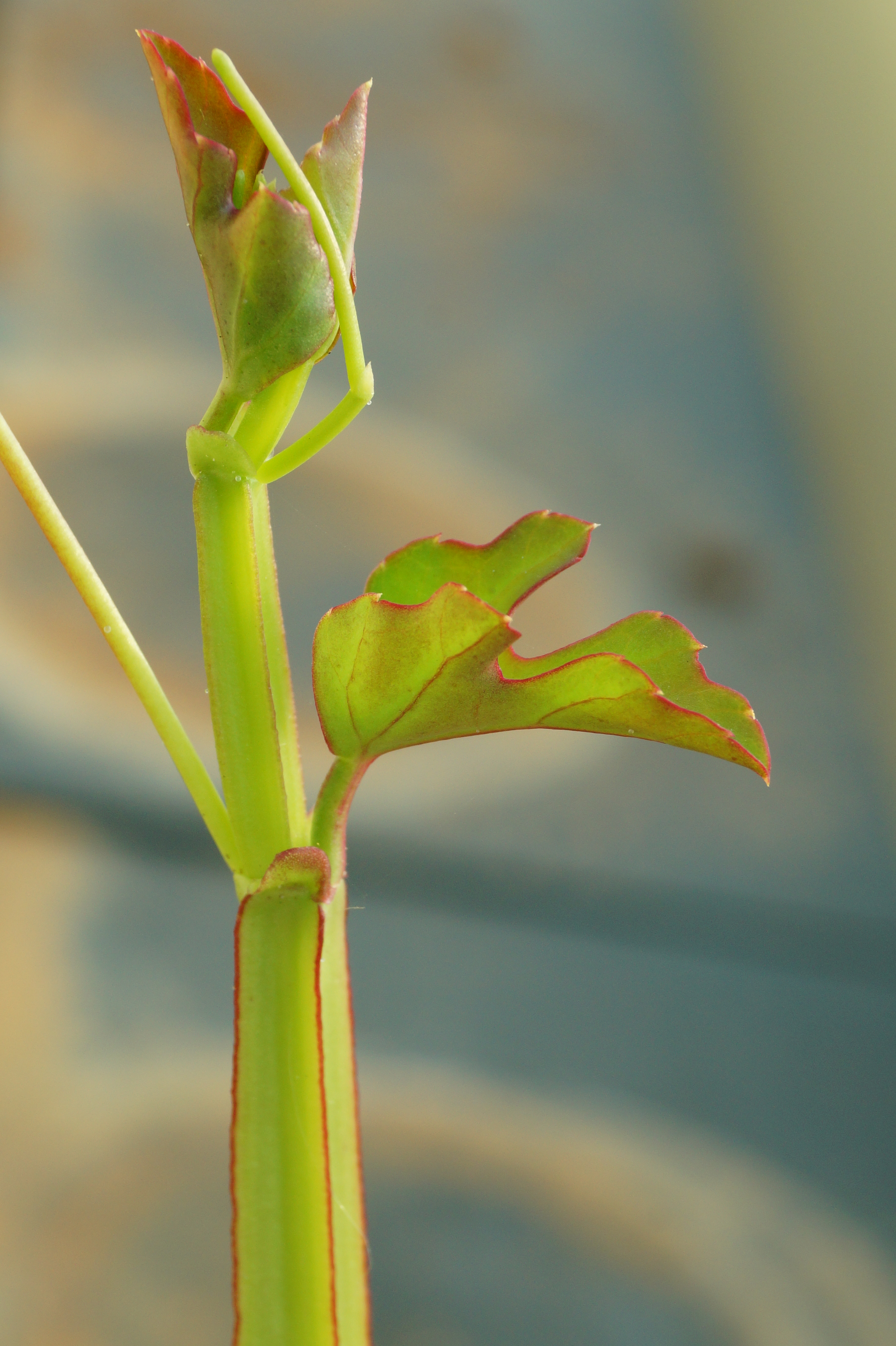
Adamant creeper sprouts

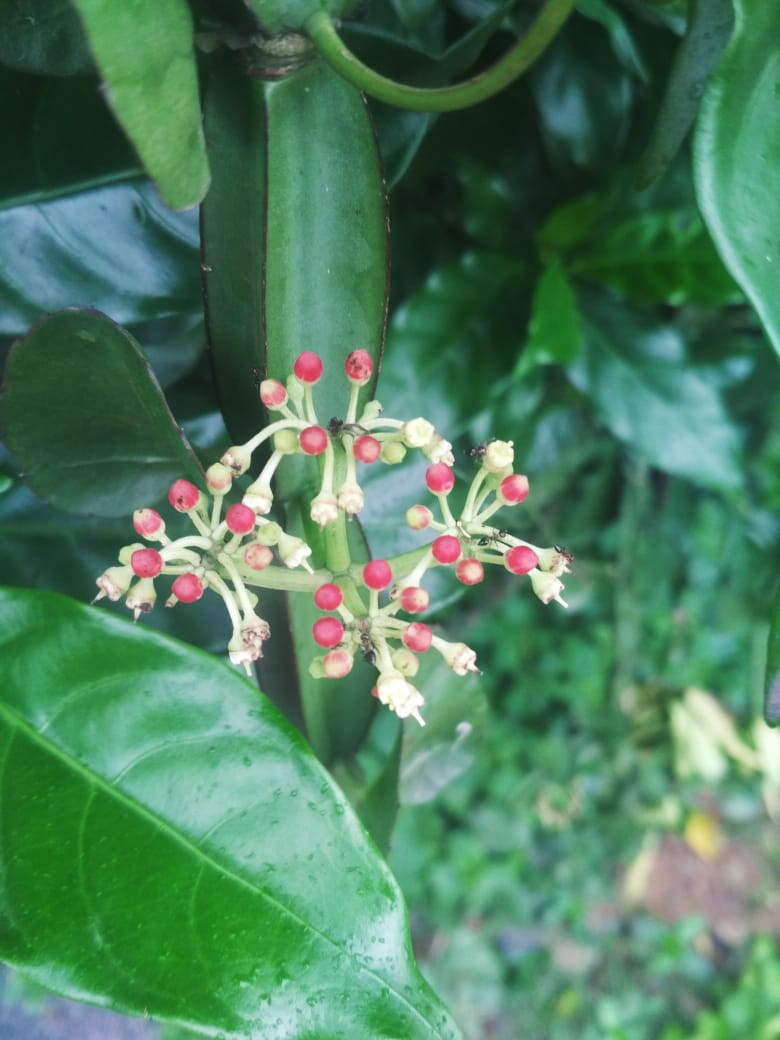
Fruit of Cissus quadrangularis

Cissus quadrangularis is a perennial plant of the grape family. It is commonly known as veldt grape, winged treebine or adamant creeper. The species is native to tropical Asia, the Arabian Peninsula and much of Africa.

== Description ==
Cissus quadrangularis reaches a height of 1.5 m (4.9 ft) and has quadrangular-sectioned branches with internodes 8–10 cm (3–4 in) long and 1.2–1.5 cm (0.5–0.6 in) wide. Along each angle is a leathery edge. Toothed trilobe leaves 2–5 cm (0.8–2.0 in) wide appear at the nodes. Each has a tendril emerging from the opposite side of the node. Racemes of small white, yellowish, or greenish flowers; globular berries are red when ripe.

Cissus quadrangularis is an evergreen climber growing to 5 m (16 ft) by .5 m (1.6 ft) at a fast rate. It is hardy to zone (UK) 10. Suitable for: light (sandy), medium (loamy) and heavy (clay) soils, prefers well-drained soil and can grow in nutritionally poor soil. Suitable pH: acid, neutral and basic (alkaline) soils and can grow in very acid and very alkaline soils. It cannot grow in the shade. It prefers dry or moist soil and can tolerate drought.

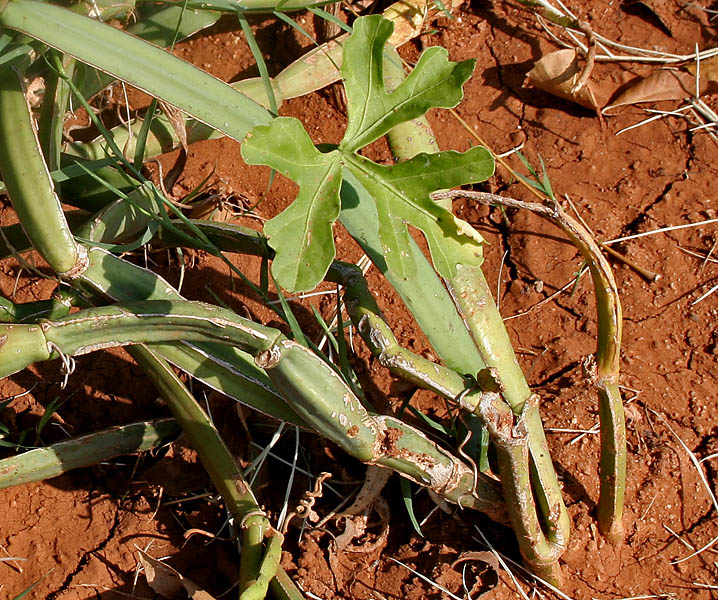
Cissus Quadrangularis in Rangareddy district of Telangana, India.

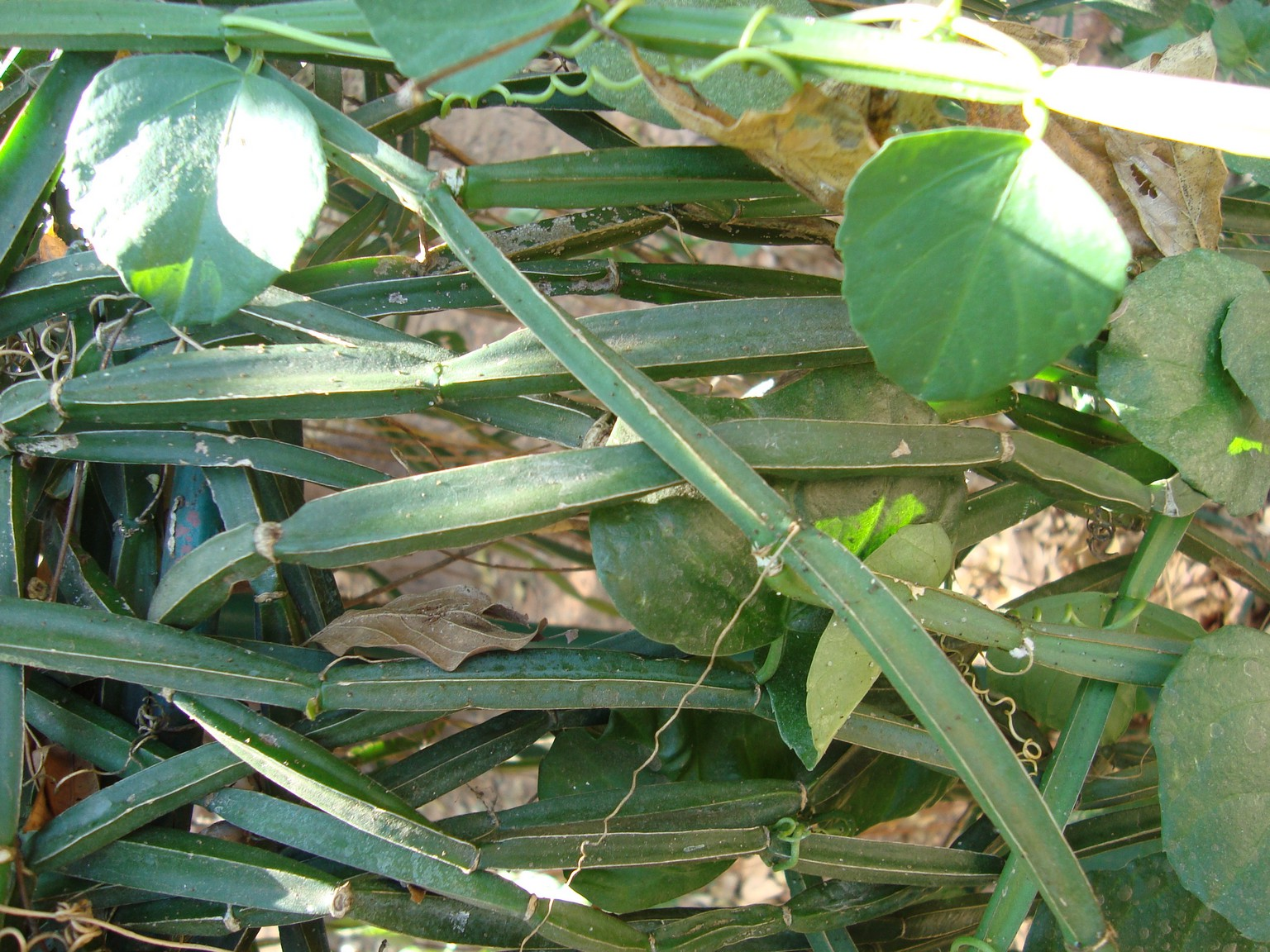
Cissus Quadrangularis in Thrissur, Kerala, India

== Traditional medicine ==
Cissus quadrangularis has been used as a medicinal plant since antiquity. Cissus has been used in various Ayurvedic classical medicines to heal broken bones and injured ligaments and tendons. In siddha medicine, it is considered a tonic and analgesic, and is believed to help heal broken bones, thus its name asthisamharaka (that which prevents the destruction of bones). The Assamese people and the Garo tribe of Meghalaya and Bangladesh have used C. quadrangularis for bone fracture.

== Experimental studies ==
C. quadrangularis has been studied for its effects in a rat model for osteoporosis. C. quadrangularis has been studied in animal models of bone fracture.

Its bactericidal effects on Helicobacter pylori indicate a potential use for treating gastric ulcers in conjunction with NSAID therapy.

The enzymatic and an in vitro cell culture study shows the potential anti-inflammatory and inhibitory properties of Cissus quadrangularis.

Furthermore, the plant may be used in many biomedical applications. The synthesis of copper oxide nanoparticles has indicated the presence of phytochemicals such as carbohydrates, alkaloids, steroids, tannins, saponins, and flavonoid. The synthesis uses plant extract.
