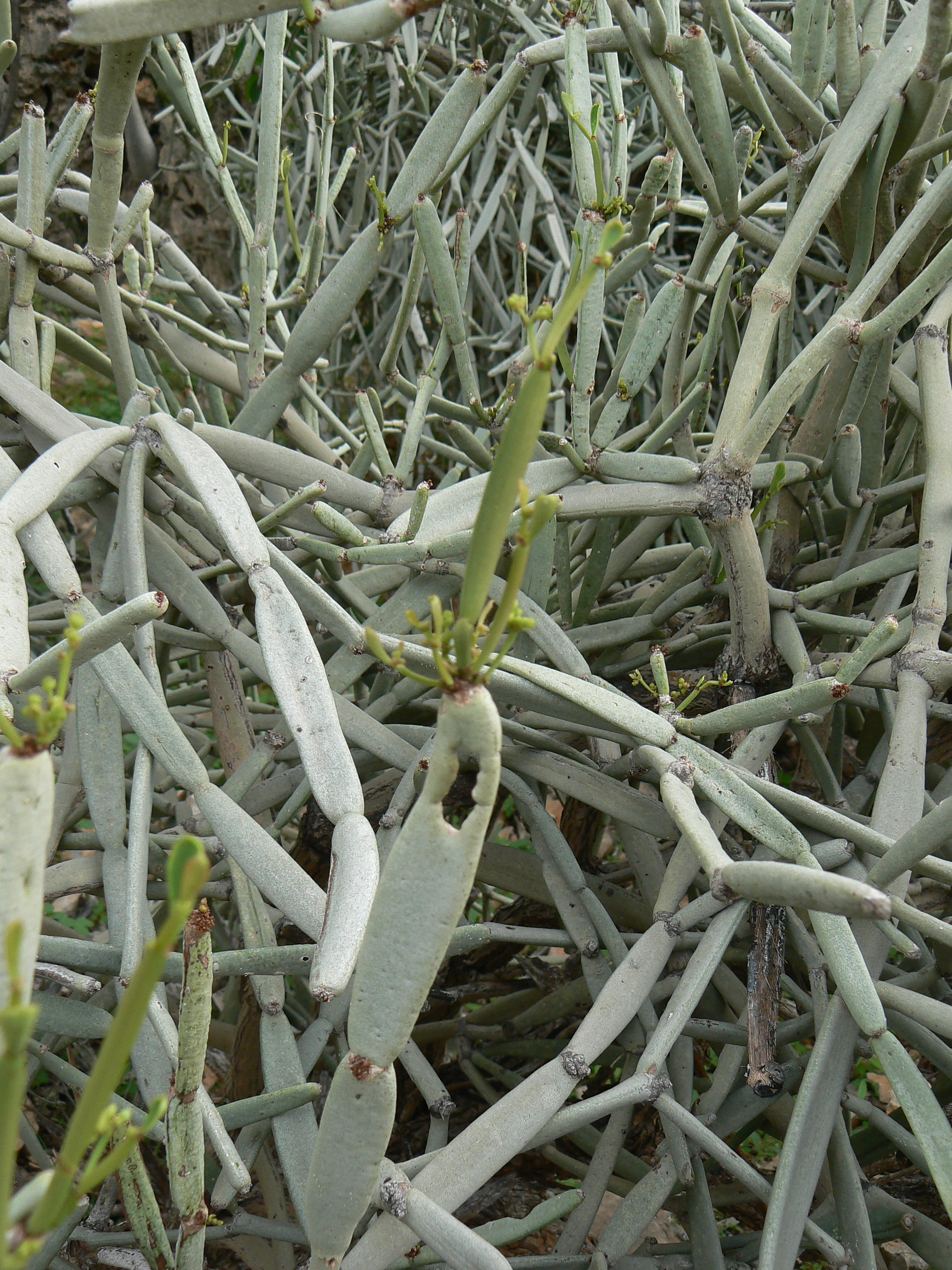

Conservation status
- Least Concern (IUCN 3.1)

Scientific classification
- Kingdom: Plantae
- Clade: Tracheophytes
- Clade: Angiosperms
- Clade: Eudicots
- Clade: Rosids
- Order: Vitales
- Family: Vitaceae
- Genus: Cissus
- Species: C. subaphylla

Binomial name
- Cissus subaphylla (Balf.f.) Planch.

Synonyms
- Vitis subaphylla Balf.f.

= Cissus subaphylla =

Species of plant

Cissus subaphylla is a low shrub in the grape family Vitaceae. It is endemic to the Yemeni islands of Socotra and Samhah. The plant grows mainly in dry, low-lying areas on alluvial fans or on limestone slopes, and is rarely found above elevations of 300 metres (980 ft), where it is replaced by C. hamaderohensis. It does not have the climbing habit of other Cissus species, and its stems are flattened and gray-green in colour, with relatively small leaves and flowers. The tangled mats of C. subaphylla stems act as a protective covering for plants regularly eaten by goats and other browsing animals; the plant is thus important in the rehabilitation of species such as Dendrosicyos, Maerua and Commiphora.

== Distribution ==
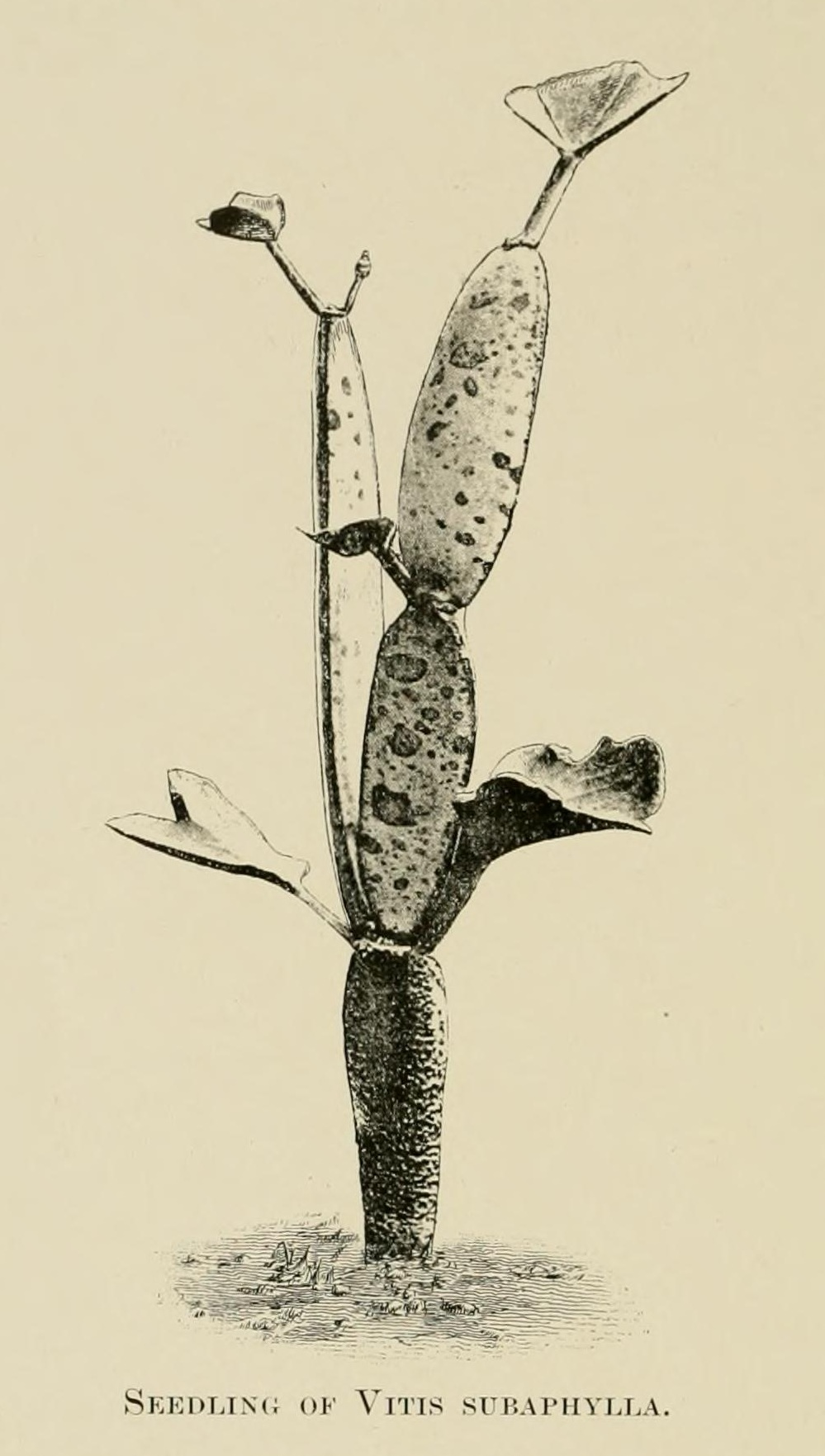
1903 illustration of a C. subaphylla seedling.

Cissus subaphylla is one of the dominant plant species found on the Socotra's coastal plains and low inland mountains. It grows in particular association with Salvadora persica and Croton socotranus, but is also found with Jatropha unicostata, Pulicaria stephanocarpa, Dendrosicyos socotranus, and Adenium obesum. subsp. sokotranum. About 270 of the island's 828 known plant species are endemic.

== Conservation status ==
The plant life on Socotra is critically threatened – of 216 known plant species endemic to Socotra and its neighbour Abd al Kuri, 132 are believed to be threatened, and of these, 85 face immediate extinction. This situation is the direct result of livestock being introduced to an island flora which has never been subjected to large grazing and browsing mammals, and thus has had no time to evolve any defence.
