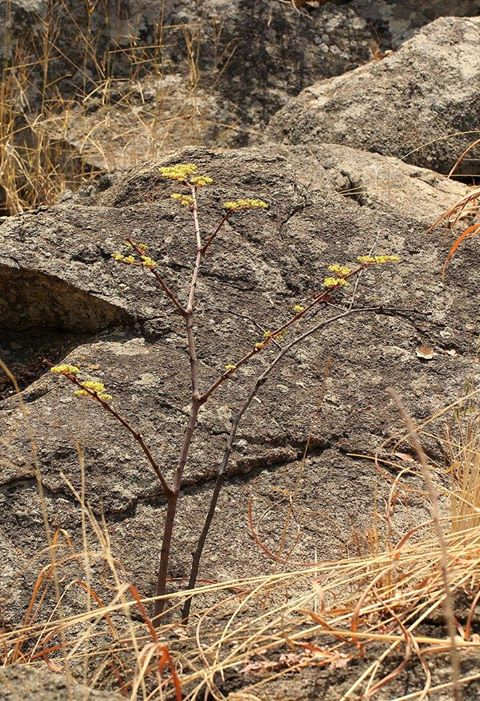

Scientific classification
- Kingdom: Plantae
- Clade: Tracheophytes
- Clade: Angiosperms
- Clade: Eudicots
- Clade: Rosids
- Order: Vitales
- Family: Vitaceae
- Genus: Cissus
- Species: C. cornifolia

Binomial name
- Cissus cornifolia (Baker) Planch.

Synonyms
- Cissus lonicerifolia C.A. Sm.; Cissus marlothii sensu Eyles; Cissus volkensii Gilg; Vitis cornifolia Baker

= Cissus cornifolia =

Species of plant

Cissus cornifolia is a species of flowering plant in the Vitaceae family. It is an erect or semi-scandent woody shrub up to 3 meters in height, and found from sub-Saharan Africa and Tropical Africa south to Botswana, Mozambique and South Africa. It is one of more than 300 species forming the genus Cissus.

Growing from a large tuberous rootstock and found up to 2000m, in open woodland and grassland, often on granite outcrops, it occasionally develops tendrils. Branch nodes are conspicuously swollen and new parts of the plant have a ferruginous, floccose covering, persisting on the bracts.

== Pharmacology and ethnic use ==
Roots or tubers are powdered or a decoction is prepared and used to treat venereal diseases, naso-pharyngeal infections, fevers and malaria. The plant is traditionally used as a sedative. Tubers and fruits are eaten and used for flavouring in sauces.

== Etymology ==
The generic name is derived from κισσος or 'kissos', a Greek word for "ivy" - 'cornifolia', having leaves resembling those of Dogwood (Cornus spp.),

== Gallery ==
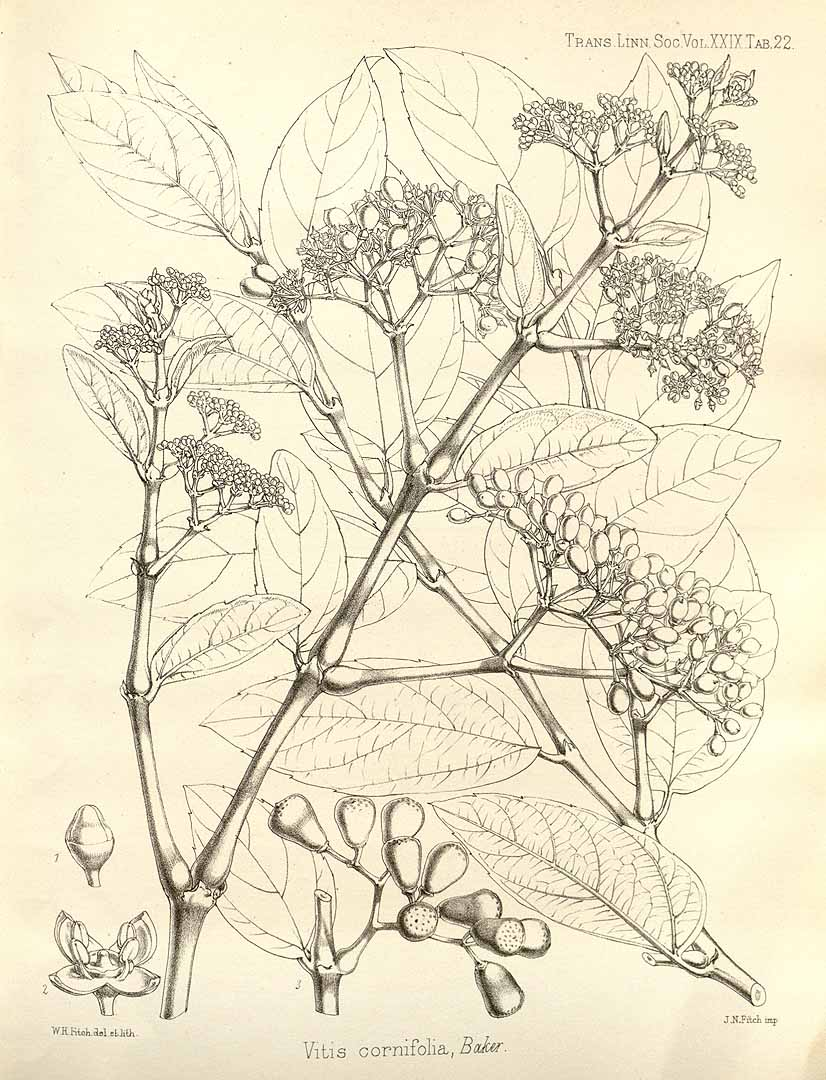

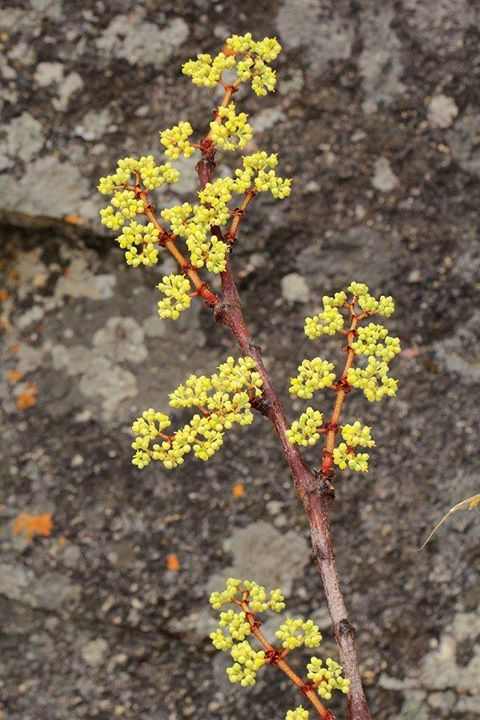

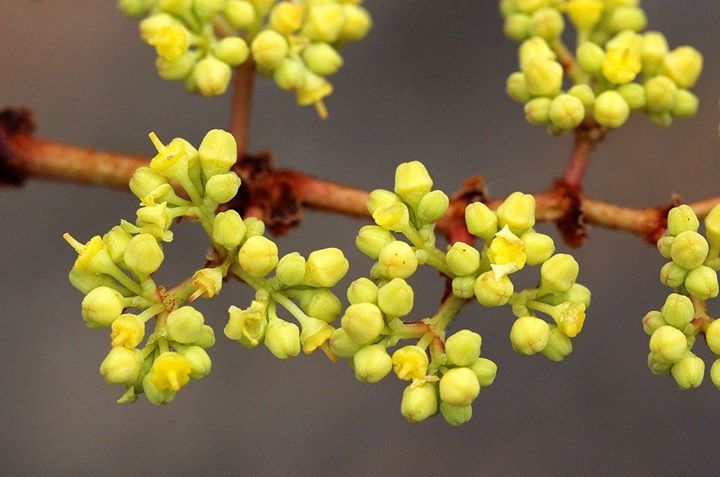

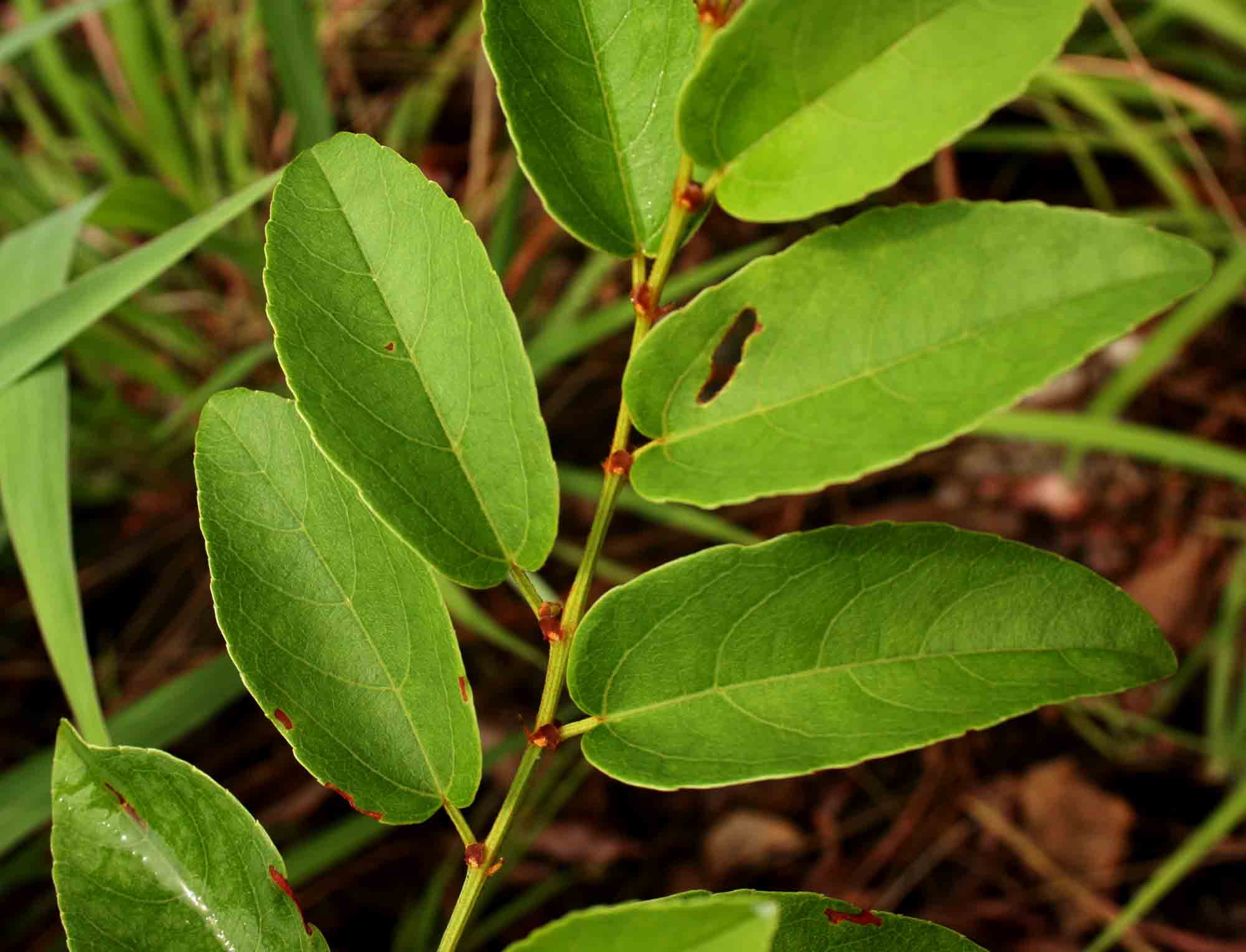
