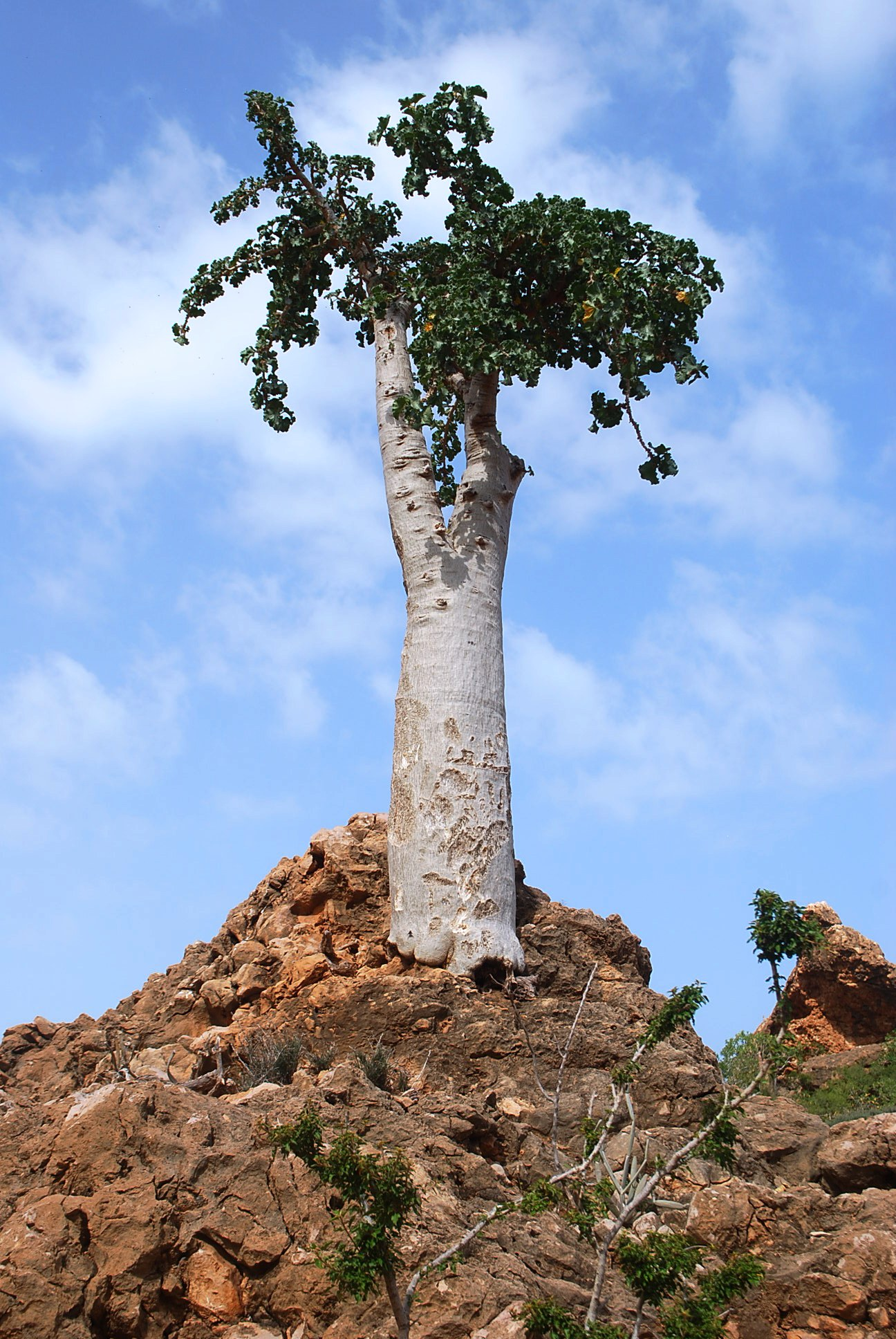

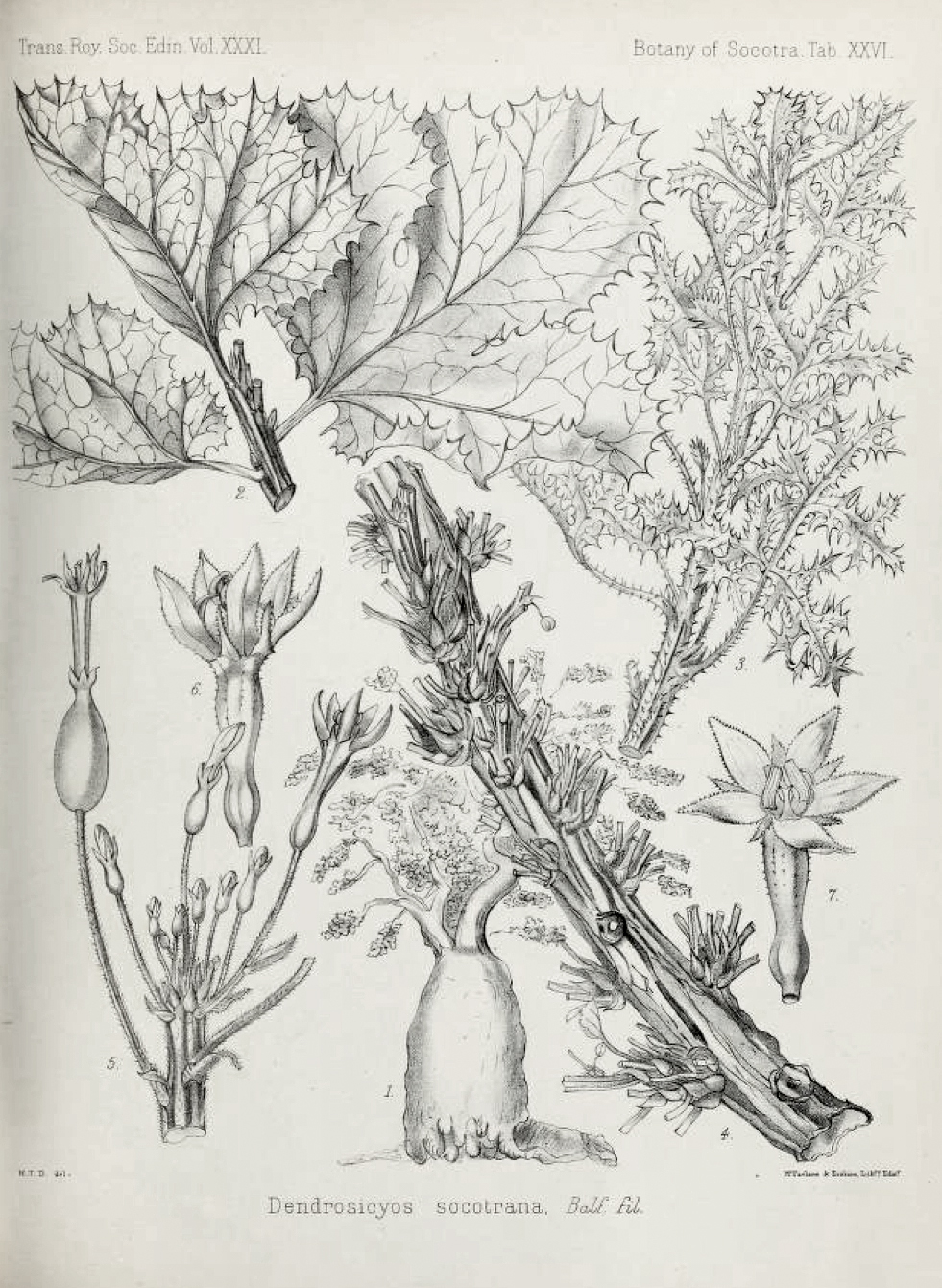

Conservation status
- Vulnerable (IUCN 3.1)

Scientific classification
- Kingdom: Plantae
- Clade: Tracheophytes
- Clade: Angiosperms
- Clade: Eudicots
- Clade: Rosids
- Order: Cucurbitales
- Family: Cucurbitaceae
- Subfamily: Cucurbitoideae
- Tribe: Coniandreae
- Genus: Dendrosicyos; Balf.f.
- Species: D. socotranus

Binomial name
- Dendrosicyos socotranus Balf.f.

= Dendrosicyos =

Species of plant

Dendrosicyos is a monotypic genus in the plant family Cucurbitaceae. The only species is Dendrosicyos socotranus, the cucumber tree. The species is endemic to the island of Socotra in Yemen, and is the only species in the Cucurbitaceae to grow in a tree form. The species name was originally spelled D. socotrana, but this is corrected to masculine grammatical gender according to the International Code of Nomenclature for algae, fungi, and plants.

== Features ==
It has a bulbous trunk and a small crown. It was first described by Isaac Bayley Balfour in 1882. A recent molecular phylogenetic analysis of the family Cucurbitaceae found that the Dendrosicyos lineage is about twice as old as the island, and thus seems to be an island relic of a progenitor lineage that became extinct on the mainland.

The leaves are nearly round, covered with fine bristles, and slightly toothed. The yellow flowers (3 cm), males and females are present on the same plant for cross pollination. It reproduces only by seed. Fruits (3 x 5 cm) are green, turning brick-red when ripe.

Seedlings subjected to overgrazing and regeneration may be compromised over time, except for seedlings protected from goats by Cissus subaphylla. The species is considered endangered. In Soqotri, its name is qamhiyn.

Contrary to what its region of origin would suggest, Dendrosicyos socotranus responds well to being drenched and fertilized, if the temperature is greater than 20 °C. Individuals in their natural habitat can attain 3 meters (10 feet) in height. Trunks are succulent, but not bottle-shaped when young. The plant produces flowers when five years old.

D. socotranus has a bottle-shaped base of fibrous wood (pachycaul). The trunk reaches a diameter of up to one meter. Numerous small twigs and branches grow from the stem, the bottle tree growth form making it distinctive.

The base consists largely of parenchyma. In it are embedded small xylem strands that are linked to each other (anastomosis). These xylem strands have a cambium, and a secondary phloem forms. There is not a consistently active cambium - it will always be sequentially formed on the periphery of a new cambium (cambium successively). Dendrosicyos is the first member of the Cucurbitaceae in which such meristem has been demonstrated.

The leaves are about 25 cm long and wide, its leaf edge being slightly thorny. On the underside of the leaves are trichomes of from two to seven cells, the cells often containing two cystoliths. The epidermal cells are lignified.

The flowers occur in the leaf axils. The species is monoecious - male and female flowers on one plant. The flowers are yellowish-orange with long petals and the fruits are ovate. The seeds are about 6 mm.

The plant contains dendrosycin, an iso-cucurbitacin with an unusual ring formation.

== Proliferation and locations ==
Described in 1882 by Isaac Bayley Balfour, the species is generally described as endemic to the island of Socotra, although some sources (1887) state that it was present on the African continent in Djibouti. It is quite abundant on the dry parts of the island of Socotra, associated with Croton socotranus in the plains, and on calcareous soils to 500 m elevation. The species is well-adapted to dry sites. It is widely distributed in several vegetation types but has a rather fragmented distribution; over large areas there are only isolated trees or small relict populations, whilst in other areas it is relatively abundant. There are a few trees on the island of Samhah, but none on Darsah or Abd al Kuri.

== Conservation status ==
In times of severe drought trees are cut down, pulped and fed to livestock. In some areas (Kilissan) this has resulted in its almost total eradication. On the plains, seedlings germinate and grow protected from livestock in the cover of dense vegetation such as provided by the spiny shrub Lycium sokotranum or by colonies of the succulent shrub Cissus subaphylla. Where there is no Cissus or Lycium, there is little if any regeneration. Thus, along the southern region of Socotra and on Samhah the recovery of populations of Dendrosicyos after drought is dependent on the presence of colonies of Cissus.

== Nomenclature ==
The genus is in the pumpkin subfamily Cucurbitoideae and in the tribe Coniandreae. Dendrosicyos is the basal taxon within the tribe, all other genera of the tribe being a sister group.

The name Dendrosicyos socotranus means 'cucumber tree of Socotra'.
