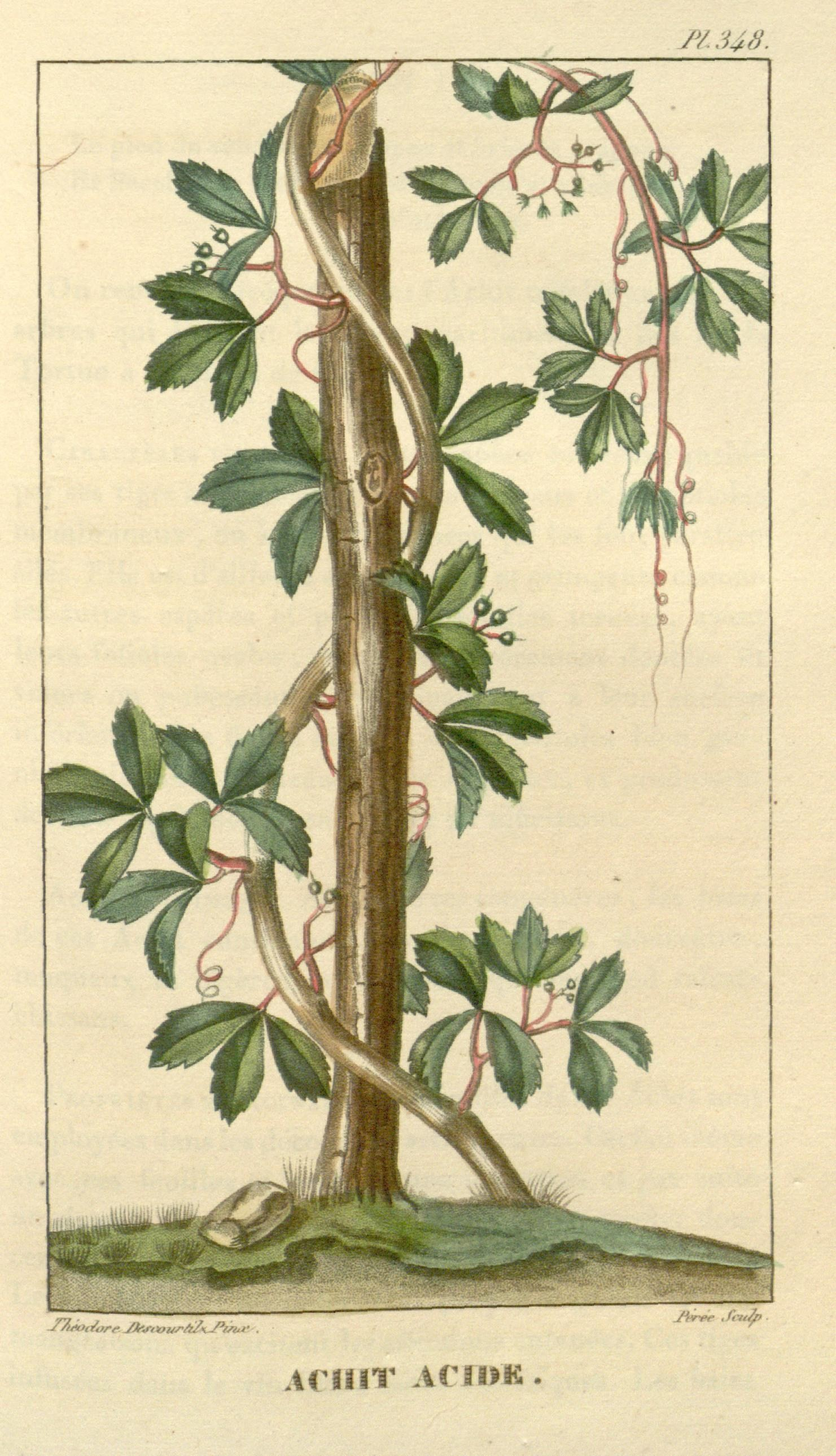

Scientific classification
- Kingdom: Plantae
- Clade: Tracheophytes
- Clade: Angiosperms
- Clade: Eudicots
- Clade: Rosids
- Order: Vitales
- Family: Vitaceae
- Genus: Cissus
- Species: C. trifoliata

Binomial name
- Cissus trifoliata (L.) L.

Synonyms
- Sicyos trifoliatus L. (basionym)

= Cissus trifoliata =

Possum-grape

Species of grapevine

Cissus trifoliata, known variously as possum-grape, sorrelvine, vine-sorrel, or hierba del buey is a New World plant species in the grape family. It is native to the southern United States, Mexico (Quintana Roo, Yucatán, Michoacán, Oaxaca, Puebla, Veracruz, Baja California, Chihuahua, Coahuila, Durango, Nuevo León, San Luis Potosí, Sinaloa, Sonora, and Tamaulipas), Venezuela, Colombia and perhaps Ecuador (Loja). It is also dispersed among some islands in the Caribbean (Aruba, Bahamas, Cuba, Hispaniola, Jamaica, Puerto Rico, and St. Croix and St. Thomas in the U.S. Virgin Islands).

This woody perennial vine has stems that are trailing or climbing. Plants arise from large rank-smelling brown-skinned tubers. Leaves are palmately tri-lobed, fleshy or semi-succulent, and tend to be persistent, but are cold-deciduous at roughly 26F. Flowers are creamy yellow, four-merous, the petals spreading at anthesis. Fruits are black or deep purple, juicy, globose berry with 1-4 seeds. The tubers of this plant are considered poisonous, and contact with the plant can cause dermatitis in those with sensitive skin.

== Ecology ==
Found in agricultural areas and escaped in waste areas, roadsides, river banks, upland slopes, sandy washes; flowering November–May.

- Possum grape also refers to Vitis cinerea
