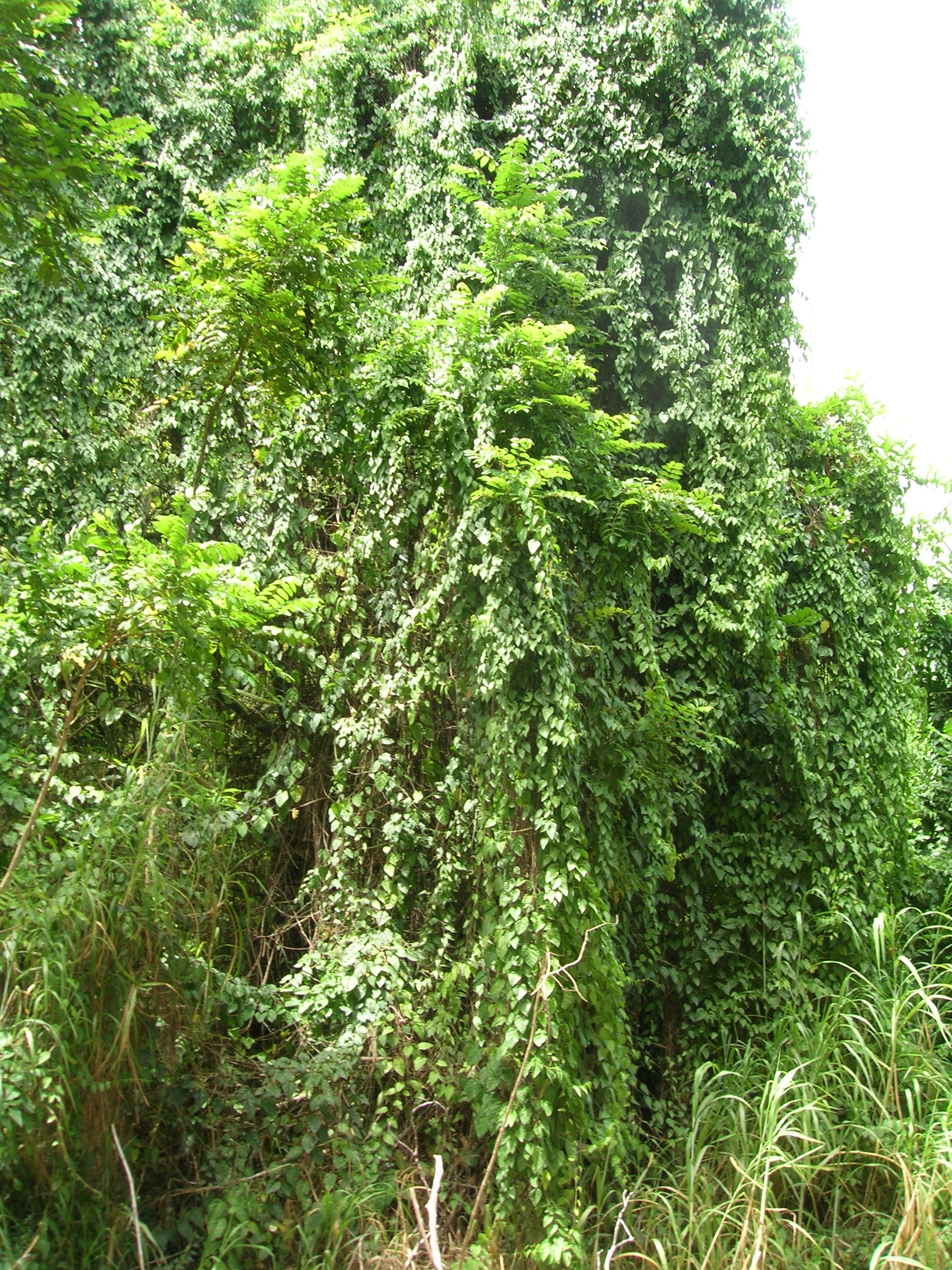

Conservation status
- Least Concern (IUCN 3.1)

Scientific classification
- Kingdom: Plantae
- Clade: Embryophytes
- Clade: Tracheophytes
- Clade: Spermatophytes
- Clade: Angiosperms
- Clade: Eudicots
- Clade: Rosids
- Order: Vitales
- Family: Vitaceae
- Genus: Cissus
- Species: C. verticillata

Binomial name
- Cissus verticillata (L.) Nicolson & C.E.Jarvis

Synonyms
- see text

= Cissus verticillata =

Species of plant

Cissus verticillata, the princess vine or seasonvine, is an evergreen perennial vine in the grapevine family Vitaceae. It grows primarily in tropical regions near sea level, including many locations in the Caribbean region.

== Description ==
The vine – a liana – is a long-stemmed, woody bush rooted in wet soil of tropical forests, and typically climbing around other plants to form a dense canopy. Extrafloral nectaries are present in this species.

== Taxonomy ==
A large number of names have been synonymized to this species; currently 72 synonyms are recognized.

== Folk medicine ==
Historical folk medicine recommendations [for the use of this plant] include [for] "weakness of the stomach", fevers and antiepileptic action. The root bark was also chewed "to strengthen teeth".

== History and naming ==
Cissus verticillata (= C. sicyoides) was discovered in 1571 in Mexico (probably in what is today the state of Michoacán) and first described in 1574 by Nicolás Monardes who named in Spanish Carlo Sancto. In Europe the plant was compared to hop (Humulus lupulus L.) so it was named by Caspar Bauhin Lupulus Mechiocanus (which means "hop of Michoacán"). The roots of Cissus verticillata were exported to Europe as material for folk medicine near the end of the 18th century.
