= Cayratia geniculata =

Scientific classification
- Kingdom: Plantae
- Clade: Tracheophytes
- Clade: Angiosperms
- Clade: Eudicots
- Clade: Rosids
- Order: Vitales
- Family: Vitaceae
- Genus: Cayratia
- Species: C. geniculata

Binomial name
- Cayratia geniculata (Blume) Gagnep.

Species of vine

Cayratia geniculata is a species of plant native to Asia. It has woody vines and 3-foliolate leaves.
