= Barrenjoey Head Lighthouse =

Lighthouse in New South Wales, Australia

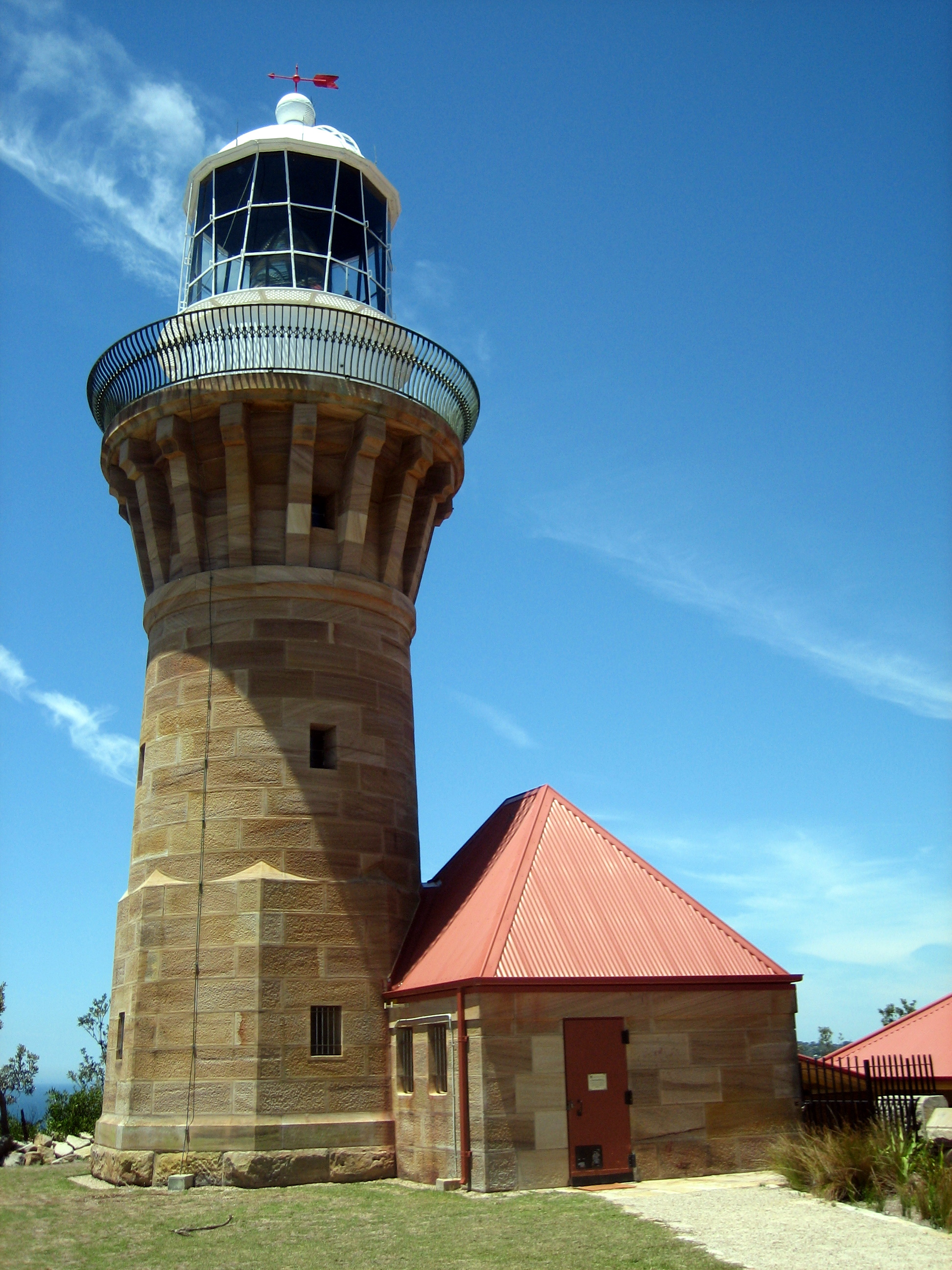
- Barrenjoey Head Lighthouse
- Location: Broken Bay, Northern Beaches Council, New South Wales, Australia
- Coordinates: 33°34′49″S 151°19′47″E

Tower
- Constructed: 1881
- Construction: Sydney sandstone (tower)
- Automated: 1932
- Height: 20 m (66 ft)
- Shape: Cylindrical tower with balcony and lantern
- Markings: Unpainted (tower), white (lantern)
- Power source: mains electricity
- Operator: NSW National Parks and Wildlife Service
- Heritage: Heritage Act — State Heritage Register

Light
- First lit: 1881
- Focal height: 113 m (371 ft)
- Lens: 2nd order Chance Brothers Fresnel lens
- Intensity: 75,000 candela
- Range: 12 nmi (22 km; 14 mi)
- Characteristic: Fl(4) W 20s

New South Wales Heritage Register
- Official name: Barrenjoey Head Lightstation
- Type: State heritage (built)
- Designated: 2 April 1999
- Reference no.: 979
- Type: Lighthouse Tower
- Category: Transport – Water
- Builders: Isaac Banks, Builder

The Barrenjoey Head Lighthouse is a heritage-listed lighthouse at Barrenjoey Headland in the Sydney suburb of Palm Beach, New South Wales, Australia. It was designed by James Barnet, the New South Wales Colonial Architect and built by Isaac Banks. It is also known as Barrenjoey Head Lightstation. The property is owned by Office of Environment and Heritage, an agency of the Government of New South Wales. The lightstation was added to the New South Wales State Heritage Register on 2 April 1999.

Completed in 1881, the current lighthouse is the third light constructed on the Barrenjoey headland in the Northern Beaches district of Sydney. The light is automated and operated by Transport for NSW; while the buildings and headland are managed by the NSW National Parks & Wildlife Service as part of Ku-ring-gai Chase National Park.

== History ==
Aboriginal Heritage

The area was known to be occupied by the Garigal people. There has not been a systematic search undertaken on the headland but numerous sites are known including three listed Aboriginal archaeological sites on Barrenjoey Headland, two middens and a cave. None of the known sites are close to the lighthouse precinct. A number of Aboriginal shell middens were exploited in Colonial times as for the burning of lime.

European History

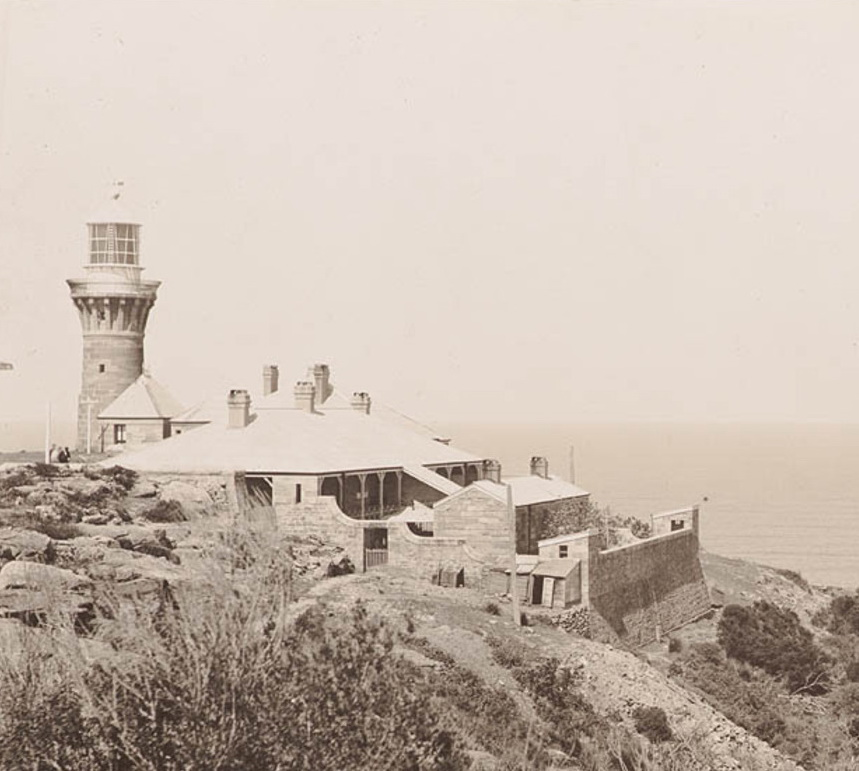
The lighthouse and the cottages, 1902.

The headland was first named as "Barrenjuee" by Governor Phillip in 1788 from the Aboriginal name for small wallaby. After many interpretations, the name is now "Barranjoey" on Admiralty maps and "Barrenjoey" on road maps. Broken Bay was once, due to the Hawkesbury River trade, a thriving port. The river was then navigable to Windsor allowing steamers carrying passengers and produce. The trade was extensively agricultural and also included the valued commodity, rum. During these early years of the Bay's use as a port, a stone jetty was constructed and a number of buildings erected to house Customs and cargo. The Customs Station established in 1843 included a wooden hut on top of Barrenjoey from which all vessels entering and leaving the port could be observed. A light was reputedly first displayed at Barrenjoey Head in rough weather in 1855, reputedly a fire basket lit in the hut, however, the first official lighthouse began operating in 1868 when two wooden buildings called the Stewart Towers were erected and lanterns shown from them as guides to mariners. The Stewart Towers, named after Robert Stewart, the member for East Sydney, who lobbied for their erection, were erected as temporary navigation aids. Broken Bay and the Pittwater were a safe haven in storms to vessels carrying coal from Newcastle to Sydney. Similarly, barges carrying food down the Hawkesbury River were a key food source for Sydney, and would harbour in the bay, awaiting favourable weather before making the 14-kilometre (8.7 mi) journey to Sydney.

In 1873 it was recommended by Francis Hixson (President of the Marine Board of NSW) that a single permanent lighthouse replace the temporary Stewart Towers. Plans were subsequently prepared and the present lighthouse and surrounding buildings were completed and the light was first exhibited on 1 August 1881. The need for the navigational aid around Broken Bay was highlighted by the number of wrecks in the area. Among the first of many wrecks in Broken Bay was the schooner Endeavour in 1825. Three lives were lost in the wreck of the ketch Traveller in 1868 and six died when the brig Minora was wrecked in 1898. Barnet had made a survey of the headland in 1877 and decided on the best location for the light. The land was then in private ownership and known as Larkfield Farm having been originally granted to James Napper in 1816.

After some delay, the foundation stone was finally laid in April 1880, by Miss Rosa Barnet. The buildings are constructed from Hawkesbury sandstone quarried on the headland, and were constructed by Mr Isaac Banks as designed by James Barnet. The original light shown from the present tower was fixed red and featured four wick burners with red screens. The tower base is octagonal in plan and features a number of small openings and Queen Victoria's 1880 royal cypher carved in the stone. The circular tower rises above the base three storeys and features large stone brackets which support the gallery around the lantern. An oil room and corridor at the base of the tower provides access to the tower which internally features iron floors and stairs. It is connected to the head keeper's cottage by a covered stair with a windbreak wall. The head keepers quarters and assistants quarters are built within a series of sandstone walls which give a compound like environment relatively protected from prevailing winds. The head keepers quarters feature verandah covered by the sweep of the corrugated iron clad roof, the decorative timber fretwork long gone. A large bay breaks the verandah at the northwestern corner in the Headkeepers quarters. The basement features a kitchen fireplace and courtyard enclosed by a massive rubble wall and with a privy in the southeast corner. The semi-detached cottages essentially consist of four rooms about a central corridor with a service block and privy in the rear courtyard. Verandahs shade the chief rooms and a covered walkway links them with the service block at their rear.

The lighthouse construction cost was £13,695, plus £2,210 for the lamp. At an elevation of 113 metres (371 ft), it is visible to a distance of 19 nautical miles (35 km; 22 mi) out to sea.

The current tower is unpainted and built of the rich-coloured local sandstone. The original lighting apparatus was a fixed red dioptric of 700 candlepower with 4 oil wick burners. In 1900, an explosion followed by a fire destroyed the ornamental roof on the adjacent oil house. The flames were subdued before reaching the tower.

During the 1931 a live bombing range was established at the entrance of Broken Bay. A target consisting of a carley float was towed into position and anchored when required for the exercises. Bombing signals were installed at the Barrenjoey Lighthouse and monitored by the keepers. The lighthouse boatsheds were used for the storage of the float and equipment. In 1932, the Barrenjoey Lighthouse was converted to automatic operation with the installation of an acetylene Dalén light of 6,000 candlepower. It was turned off and on by a Sun valve. Although the acetylene gas apparatus was efficient, access to the tower for re-supply presented problems, so in 1972 the lighthouse was converted to electric operation, with a new lamp capable of 75,000 candlepower.

With automation, the lightkeepers were no longer needed and finally withdrawn. This left the area unprotected. During the 1940s correspondence concerning the lease of the headland and cottages outlined certain conditions. A lease of a portion of the defence reserve including part of the lighthouse property required an agreement that no structures be erected or any other work be carried out that will obstruct the view of or from the lighthouse, Trig Station or Gledhill Lookout Cairn. Work should also not interfere in any way with the Mulhall's grave and old Lighthouse monument. A memo to the property officer dated 1944 noted that the cottages at the lighthouse were broken into and one cottage in particular was damaged. A number of enquiries were made from this time relating the lease of the cottages and surrounding land. In 1949 approval was given the Warringah Shire Council for a permissive occupancy of an unleased portion of the defence reserve at Barrenjoey. The cottages were finally reoccupied during the 1950s and have since been restored and altered according to the needs of the tenants.

Since the 1980s it has been featured heavily in the soap opera Home and Away, both during the credits and during the show itself.

== Keepers and cottages ==
There is a head keeper's cottage as well as two assistant keeper's cottages located on the headland. They are built from Hawkesbury sandstone quarried from the site, and have galvanized iron roofs.

Keepers of the lighthouse were:

Ordinal	Keeper	Start date	End date	Notes
1	George Mulhall	1881	1885	
2	George Mulhall, Jnr.	1881?	1891	
3	Robert William Russell	1910	1920	
4	Richard Sullivan	1921	1925	
–	Robert William Russell	1925	1931	
5	John Berryman	1931	1932	
–	automated	1932	1960	Cottages were unoccupied and subject to neglect and vandalism
–	automated	1960	1997	The cottages were leased
–	automated	1997	present	The cottages were taken over by the NSW National Parks & Wildlife Service (NPWS), who removed many non-native plants and spent $230,000 restoring the cottages, lighthouse, and walking tracks.

For 31 years, from 1968 until 1999, Jervis Sparks leased Cottage 2 at Barrenjoey lighthouse. It was an assistant keeper's cottage and had no electricity nor running water. When he took over the lease it was a vandalised ruin, and over many years he restored it to a comfortable 1800s era home, full of warmth and character. Sparks' Montreal born wife, Bridget, and he were married there in 1974. They were the unofficial caretakers of the lightstation and the headland. In 1992 Sparks published the first definitive history of that lighthouse, Tales From Barranjoey, written on a Macintosh PowerBook 100 and powered via a solar panel. 3,000 copies were printed and the few remaining copies are collector's items, as the book is now out of print. Sparks was forced to vacate to Queensland when the management of all Australian lightstations (now all automatic and without any keepers or other protective human presence) was transferred from Commonwealth control, under the Australian Maritime Safety Authority (AMSA), to state control, which in this case was the NPWS. Sparks continued to advise NPWS on all historical and environmental concerns concerning Barrenjoey Headland. Before leaving, Bridget and Jervis Sparks were awarded the first-ever issued Pittwater Medal by Pittwater Council for their years of volunteer, historical and environmental work for the benefit of Barrenjoey, Palm Beach and the Northern Beaches in general. Jervis Sparks has decided to complete a quartet of books about Barrenjoey lighthouse, resulting in the second book, The Red Light of Palm Beach, detailing the lives of many of the lighthouse keepers who manned Barrenjoey from 1881 until 1932, when it became automated.

The light itself is currently operated by Transport for NSW.

== International Lighthouse and Lightship Weekend ==
Each year the Manly-Warringah Radio Society celebrate International Lighthouse and Lightship Weekend by activating an amateur radio station at the Barrenjoey lighthouse. The goal of the weekend is "to promote public awareness of lighthouses and lightships and their need for preservation and restoration, to promote amateur radio and to foster International goodwill". Over the course of the weekend some of the over 400 radio-active lighthouses around the world will be contacted from headland, usually on HF frequencies.

== Description ==
Context

The headland projects out into Broken Bay forming its southern entrance. To the north is Bouddi National Park along the Central Coast. Lion Island and the northern shore of Broken Bay present a natural backdrop. Ku-ring-gai Chase National Park defines the western side of Pittwater, with West Head as the most prominent topographical feature. In Broken Bay are three island nature reserves; Lion Island, located just inside the entrance to Broken Bay and visible from Barrenjoey, was classified as a nature reserve under the National Parks and Wildlife Act 1967; Long Island and Spectacle Island reserves, dedicated in 1972, are located further inland and are important for their natural and cultural values. Palm Beach sweeps south of the Barrenjoey Headland. Further south, stretches of beach are framed by the various points and headlands.

Setting

Barrenjoey Lightstation is located on the Barrenjoey Head at the southern entrance to Broken Bay. The headland was once an island joined to the mainland through the formation of a tombolo (Palm Beach) at the end of the last ice age (approximately 10,000 years ago). The lighthouse reserve is about 10 hectares (25 acres) in area, the remainder of the headland being part of Ku-ring-gai Chase National Park. The Barrenjoey Headland is located at the northern end of Palm Beach, separated from the Sydney suburbs of Whale Beach and Palm Beach by a spit, with the lighthouse as the focal point on the headland. The natural character of the headland, curving into Broken Bay and Pittwater, contrasts with the heavily urbanised backdrop of Palm Beach and similar areas to the south of Pittwater.

Natural attributes

Barrenjoey Headland itself retains plant associations typical of other headlands in the Sydney region before clearing occurred. Black she-oak scrub covers the more exposed areas, with bangalay forest and small rainforest patches in more sheltered parts. Ocean rock platforms are inaccessible and less subject to scavenging than other Sydney platforms. These, together with associated rocky reefs and the seagrass beds in the sheltered bay, form a valuable littoral and sub-littoral environment.

The Littoral rainforest at the base of the headland, includes two species considered significant, as they are uncommon in the Sydney Region – Pararchidendron pruinosum (snow wood) and Flagellaria indica (twining bamboo). Two fauna (bird) species listed on the schedules of the Threatened Species Conservation Act 1995 have been recorded at Barrenjoey Headland. They are Pandion haliaetus (the osprey) and Sterna fuscata (sooty tern).

Littoral Rainforest in the NSW North Coast, Sydney Basin and South East Corner Bioregions have been listed as an endangered ecological community. The Barrenjoey Headland community occurs as a low closed forest with the canopy generally being 4-8m high throughout the type. The rainforest occupies only a small area of the headland (approx. 1 ha). The canopy is composed of a number of species, which include Guioa semiglauca, Acmena smithii (lily pilly), Pittosporum undulatum (sweet pittosporum), Syzygium oleosum (brush cherry), Parachidendron pruinosum (snow wood), Rhodomyrtus psidioides and Cassine australis. Vines are also present, the most common being Cissus antarctica (kangaroo vine), but others include Cissus hypoglauca (water vine), Parsonsia sp. (native jasmine), Leichhardtia rostrata, Hibbertia dentata (golden guinea flower) and Hibbertia scandens (snake vine). The climber Flagellaria indica and epiphytic orchids (Dendrobium linguiforme) can be located in the rainforest. The cabbage palm species Livistonia australis is a conspicuous canopy emergent.

Aboriginal values

Barrenjoey Headland (part of Ku-ring-gai Chase National Park) occurs in the country of the Guringai people (Garigal Clan) who utilised the bushland, headland and shoreline for different purposes. Eight recorded Aboriginal sites appear on the NPWS Register for Barrenjoey Headland and Palm Beach. These sites include middens on the spit, sheltered campsites, and engravings. There are no known sites within the immediate vicinity of the lighthouse precinct, or proposed construction zones. A potential archaeological deposit (PAD) has been recorded at the top of the Smugglers Track.

Buildings and structures

The principal buildings are the Lighthouse tower, Head Keeper's cottage, and Assistant Keepers' duplex with two semi-detached dwellings, associated outbuildings, boatshed and other site features. The three cottages are cut into the ridge behind the tower, giving protection against the prevailing north easterlies. This composition utilises a strong pattern of sandstone retaining walls to define the front yards of the cottages and to link the main house to the tower. Barrenjoey is the only face sandstone tower in the NPWS collection. The tower is 19.5 metres (64 ft) high and the focal plane of the light is 112 metres (367 ft) above high water. It has a range of 40 kilometres (22 nmi). The tower base is octagonal in plan to a height of 4 metres (13 ft) and circular above. It is divided into three storeys with iron floors and staircases. The walls are 900 millimetres (35 in) thick at the base tapering to 600 millimetres (24 in) at the top. The gallery around the lantern is cantilevered on massive stone brackets capped with elegant gunmetal balustrade. A square oil room at the base of the tower is connected to the head keeper's cottage by a covered stair with a windbreak wall integral with both buildings. The Head Keeper's Quarters is constructed in sandstone, with timber floors and a pyramidal pitched roof of corrugated steel. The northwestern facade has a bay window flanked by verandahs which return along to the southern facade. The bay looks into a courtyard enclosed by sandstone walling. A covered way to the tower joins the verandah at the northeastern corner. The house is on two levels, with kitchen and service areas below and six rooms arranged around a central hallway above. The six rooms are currently set out as four bedrooms, storeroom and sitting room containing the north-facing bay window. Five fireplaces remain. A privy is also located at the southeastern corner of the lower level. The Assistant keepers' duplex is also of sandstone with timber floors. Each has four rooms about a hallway and the pair is symmetrical about a central party wall. Each cottage has a verandah, reached by stair on the north and connected by another stair to a service building at its rear. The main section features four rooms about a central hallway of sandstone, with timber floors. A single hipped roof clad in corrugated steel spans both dwellings. This building has been substantially rebuilt after being burnt. The internal walls have been completely stripped of their internal finishes. Joinery has been reconstructed and the rooms adapted to suit the occupants' lifestyle. A sandstone kitchen, store room and separate privy occupy the rear yard enclosed by a sandstone wall. Two underground water tanks are located in the space between the main building and the service structure. The timber-framed and weatherboard clad Customs Station cottage has four main rooms about an open, west-facing verandah with several other rooms to their rear. It is built with a timber floor and colorbond corrugated roof.

Lighthouse equipment

The tower contains the 3.7-metre (12 ft) diameter Chance Bros cast-iron-and-copper lantern house of segmental cast iron, copper-clad dome and precast internal and external catwalks. It has diagonal pattern glazing system associated with fixed optics. The optic does not rotate on a chariot but sits on its original cast-iron main pedestal. The optic glass is horizontally banded in "belts" and the centrally light is mounted on a smaller cast-iron pedestal. The Barrenjoey lens and pedestal are rare in Australia as being a 700-millimetre (28 in) Chance Bros fixed optic light. Disused 1932 acetylene sun valve and flasher associated with the place are present in a stored condition. The light was converted to electricity in 1972. The light is still operational and is maintained as a navigational aid by the NSW State Government serving recreational boating in Pittwater.

A disused 1932 acetylene sun valve and flasher associated with the place are present in a stored condition.

Cultural landscape

The foreground to the headland, when approached from Palm Beach, is the extensive Council car park. Access to the lightstation is by 4-wheel-drive road, by walking along Pittwater Beach and up the rough stone-flagged road to the summit or by walking the "smugglers trail". The summit forms a cultural precinct with the buildings nestled behind the trees on the rear face of the ridge. The timber cottage and boat shed are located south west of the lighthouse complex, on Barrenjoey beach facing Pittwater. The cottage is associated with the Customs Station. A vegetable garden is believed to have been located to the rear of the timber cottages. A number of Coral trees presently surround this cottage and the boatshed adjacent. Lantana and privet also attest to European occupation. Otherwise, the vegetation is coastal heath, modified in the vicinity of the lightstation. A man-proof fence as protection against vandalism presently surrounds the lighthouse tower. The location of a flagstaff blown down about 1950 is indicated by eyebolts near the Trig Station. An earlier flagstaff (probably associated with the Stewart Tower) is shown on Barnet's 1877 plan and on a c. 1885 photograph. A memorial cairn/obelisk was unveiled in 1935 on the site of the Stewart Towers and named after P. W. Gledhill, a noted local historian. The two graves to the east of the tower are those of the first lightkeeper, George Mulhall, who apparently died when struck by lightning in June 1885, and of his wife Mary, who died the following year. The Gledhill Lookout Cairn is built from stone taken from the first lighthouse. Other features on the headland summit include the quarry, lookout markers and water tanks. At the rear of the houses and in front of the tower, random stone terracing was constructed. Remnants of a World War 2 concrete searchlight mount adjoin the Trig Station. Other defence-related features might be present.

=== Condition ===
The lighthouse and main residence are intact. The Duplex is in a stable condition and adapted with loss of finishes following fire c. 1940s.

The property retains high integrity in the tower and head keeper's residence.

=== Modifications and dates ===
The cottages were heavily damaged by vandals during the 1940s, following unmanning of the station and later leased by residents who have repaired and adapted the houses for their own use. The Australian Maritime Safety Authority also undertook basic maintenance. The boat shed was apparently constructed by the Nott family in the 1970s. It is a small timber-framed structure clad in asbestos cement sheet with concrete floor and corrugated colorbond roof. In 1972 the light was converted to electric operation from mains power with a backup emergency battery start generator. The original optical lens supplied by Chance Bros. of Birmingham is still in use today with a focal height of 113 metres (371 ft) above sea level and a range of 35 kilometres (19 nmi).

== Heritage listing ==
Barrenjoey Lightstation and its setting are highly significant as one of a collection of lighthouses which combine the natural values of a rugged coastal environment with the cultural values of a prominent landmark. Built as an isolated outpost of European settlement it demonstrates the development of coastal shipping in the late 19th century. The light tower retains its original function today using recent technology to allow for automated operation. It is a notable work of NSW Colonial Architect James Barnet which retains components of 19th-century lighthouse technologies. This site retains evidence of cultural values, both Aboriginal and European, legible in the landscape which demonstrates the changing uses of the site, against a constant of natural values.

Barrenjoey Head Lighthouse was listed on the New South Wales State Heritage Register on 2 April 1999 having satisfied the following criteria.

The place is important in demonstrating the course, or pattern, of cultural or natural history in New South Wales.

Barrenjoey Lightstation is a significant intact example of a late Victorian lightstation designed by James Barnet, the NSW Colonial Architect in the period 1862–90. The complex of buildings at the Barrenjoey Lightstation are the oldest remaining structures in Pittwater and remain as evidence of the earlier coastal shipping use of the Bay and Hawkesbury River.

The place is important in demonstrating aesthetic characteristics and/or a high degree of creative or technical achievement in New South Wales.

The light tower is perhaps the finest of Barnet's towers because of its attractive sandstone construction. Barnet can also be said to have reintroduced pavilion entrances to the lighthouse design in NSW. It is a substantial and relatively intact 19th-century lightstation of outstanding architectural quality. The headland is a dramatic landform of great natural beauty. The construction of the lightstation provides a counterpoint and human scale. While the vegetation has been modified over the 100 years it contributes to the evocative nature and character of the place. The lantern is an example of the 19th-century industrial technology and is intact apart from some modernisation of the light source. The cast-iron stair in the lighthouse is a very good example of its type. Barrenjoey retains it distinctive gunmetal balustrade which is a mark of Barnet towers. The houses are constructed in ashlar stonework of considerable quality, with high stone garden walls and substantial retaining walls which also distinguish them from other comparable designs. However, virtually none of the internal finishes have survived.

The place has a strong or special association with a particular community or cultural group in New South Wales for social, cultural or spiritual reasons.

The lightstation is significant as an important element in the establishment of navigational aids along the NSW coast which reflects the economic development of the surrounding region. The various remains, earlier and associated features are significant for the role they played in the early navigation and coastal shipping network, commercial shipping and network and by their association with the functioning and role of the lighthouse complex. The lightstation and the Mulhall Graves are significant for providing evidence of the changing living and working conditions of the lighthouse keepers and their families

The place has potential to yield information that will contribute to an understanding of the cultural or natural history of New South Wales.

The lighthouse retains the original Chance Bros. cast-iron-and-copper lantern house. Barrenjoey has an unusual fixed optic, rare in Australia, that is fixed and sits on its original cast-iron main pedestal. The place retains its disused 1932 acetylene sun valve and flasher. The tower is of considerable industrial archaeological significance in its ability to demonstrate the evolution of lighthouse technology. The headland itself potentially has great archaeological significance, retaining elements with various associations that demonstrate the former uses and evolution of the place.

The place possesses uncommon, rare or endangered aspects of the cultural or natural history of New South Wales.

Chance Brothers lantern house and rare fixed optic, together with disused 1932 acetylene sun valve and flasher.

The place is important in demonstrating the principal characteristics of a class of cultural or natural places/environments in New South Wales.

Prominent landmark with integrated natural and cultural values, with the tower being a fine example in sandstone of a James Barnet lighthouse design.

== See also ==
- List of lighthouses in Australia
