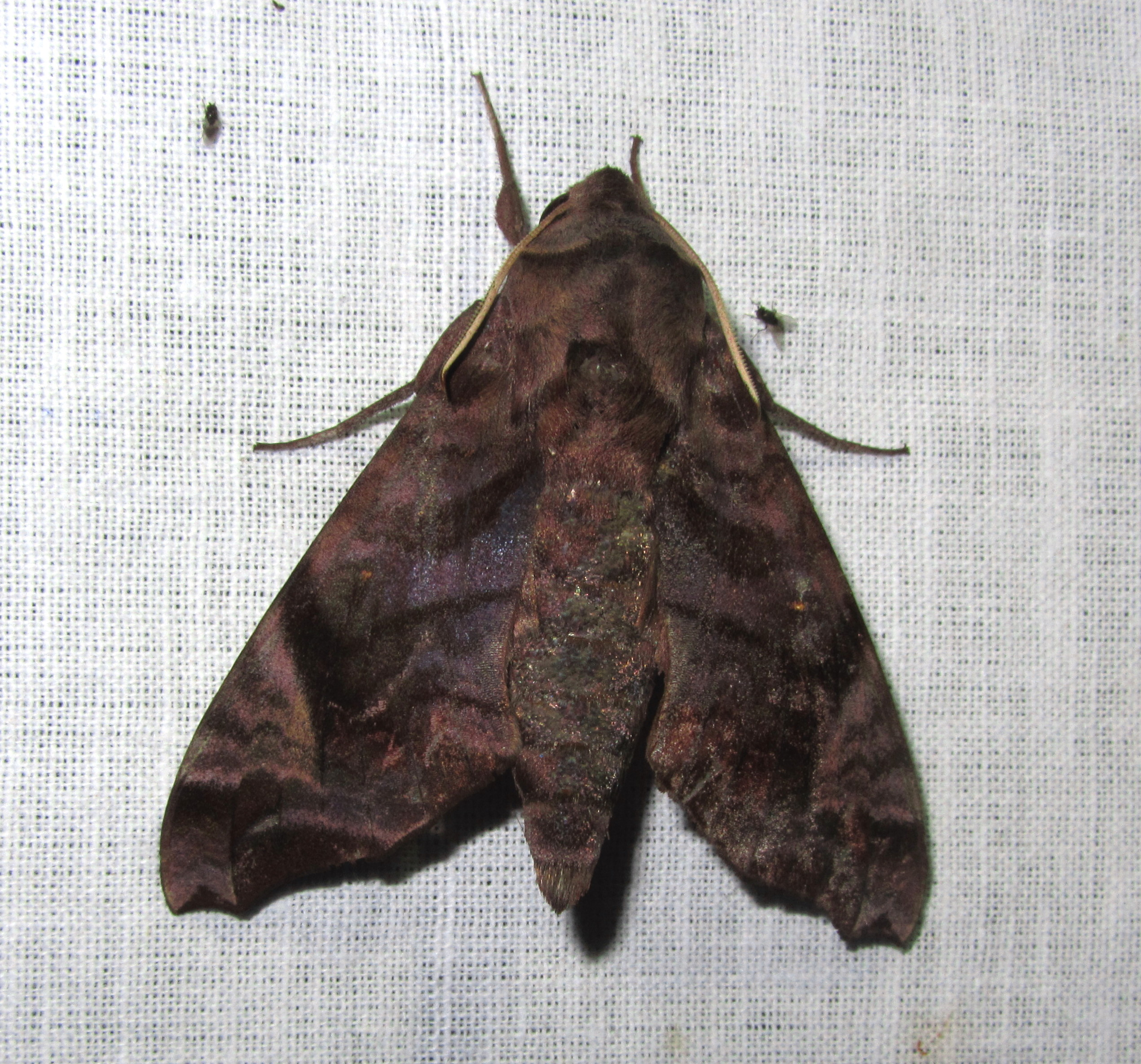

Scientific classification
- Domain: Eukaryota
- Kingdom: Animalia
- Phylum: Arthropoda
- Class: Insecta
- Order: Lepidoptera
- Family: Sphingidae
- Genus: Acosmeryx
- Species: A. anceus

Binomial name
- Acosmeryx anceus (Stoll, [1781])

Synonyms
- Sphinx anceus Stoll, [1781]; Zonilia mixtura Walker, [1865]; Enyo cinnamomea Herrich-Schäffer, [1869]; Acosmeryx daulis Boisduval, [1875]

= Acosmeryx anceus =

Species of moth

Acosmeryx anceus is a moth of the family Sphingidae. It was described by Caspar Stoll in 1781, and it is known from India, Myanmar, New Guinea, and Queensland, Australia.

== Description ==
The wingspan is 70–88 mm.

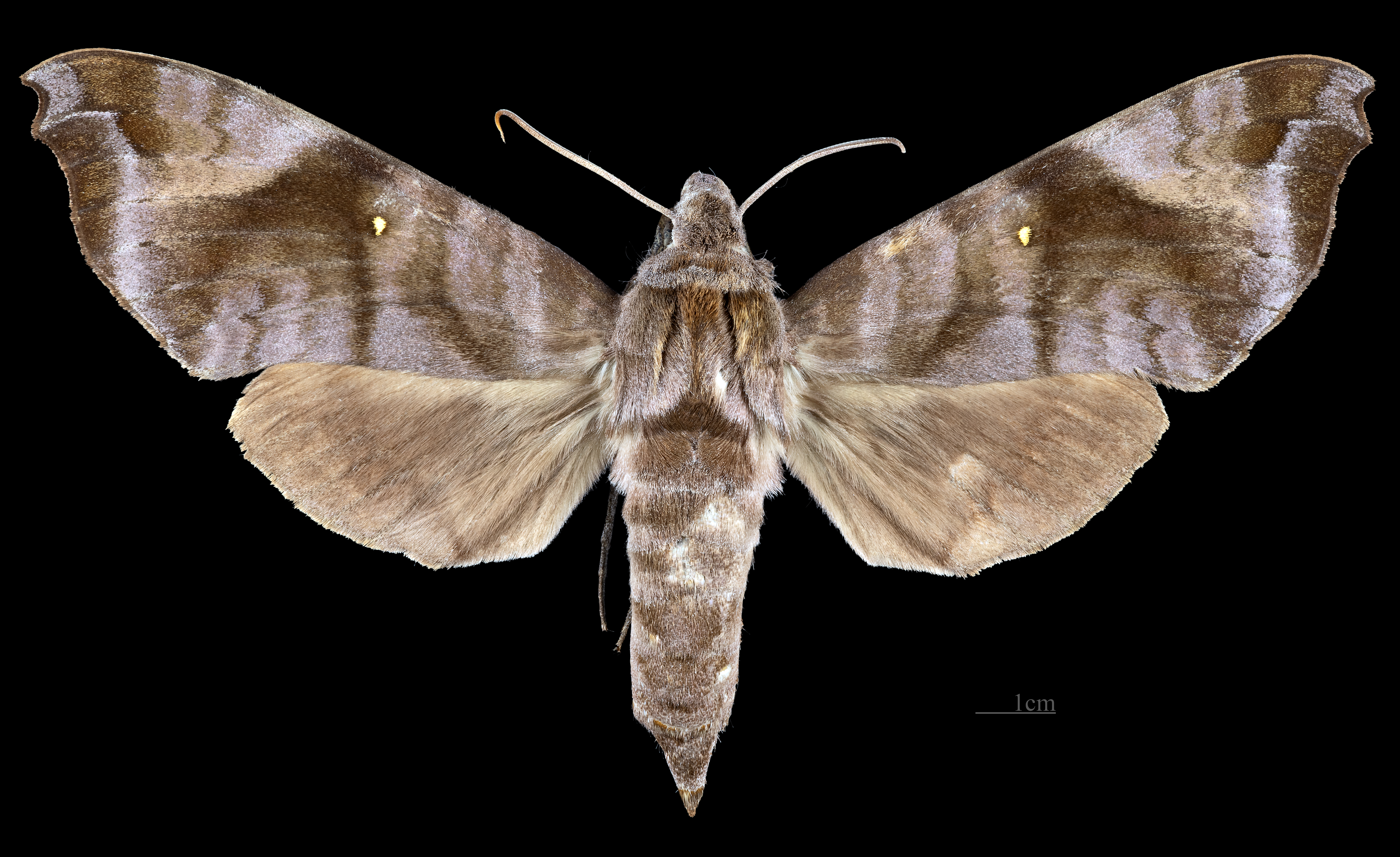
Female dorsal

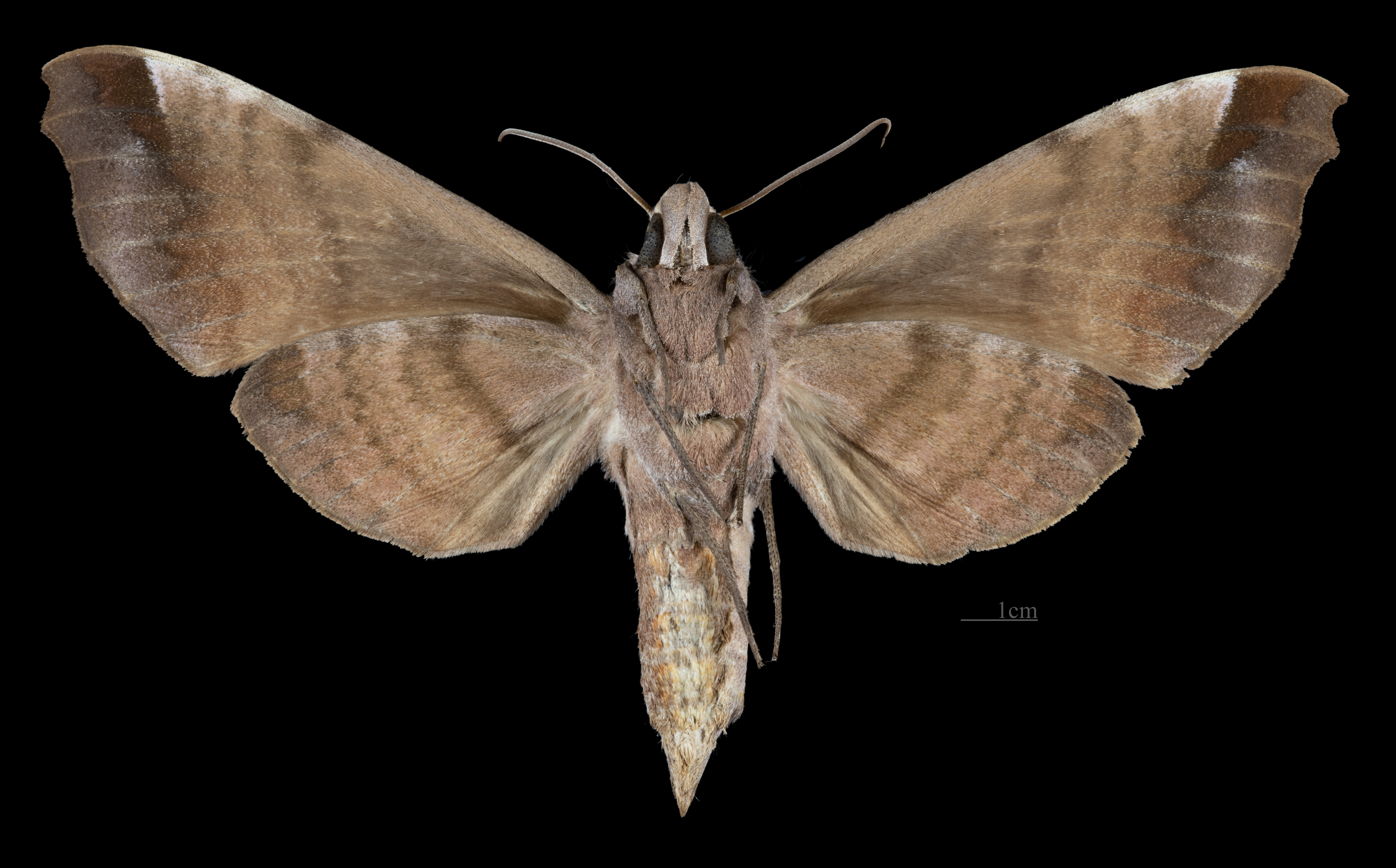
Female ventral

== Biology ==
The larvae of subspecies subdentata have been found on plants in the genera Leea, Cayratia, Cissus, and Vitis. Larvae of ssp. anceus have been recorded on Cayratia clematidea, Cissus antarctica and Vitis vinifera.

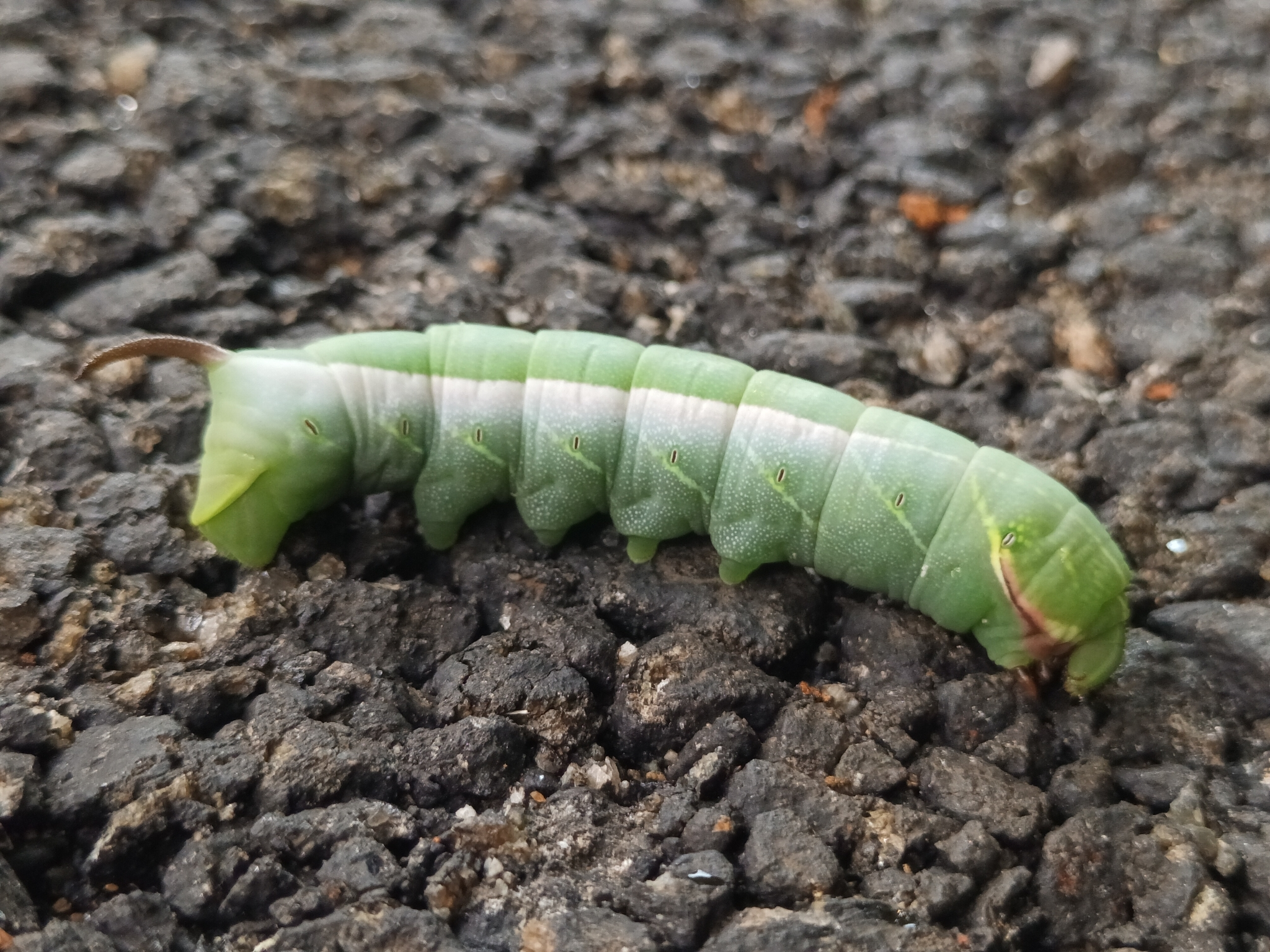
Last instar larva from Ranni, Kerala, India

== Subspecies ==
- Acosmeryx anceus anceus (Queensland and New South Wales)
- Acosmeryx anceus subdentata Rothschild & Jordan, 1903 (southern and eastern India, Nepal, Bhutan, Thailand, southwestern China (Yunnan, Guangxi), Vietnam, Malaysia, Indonesia (Sumatra, Java, Kalimantan, Sumbawa) and the Philippines)
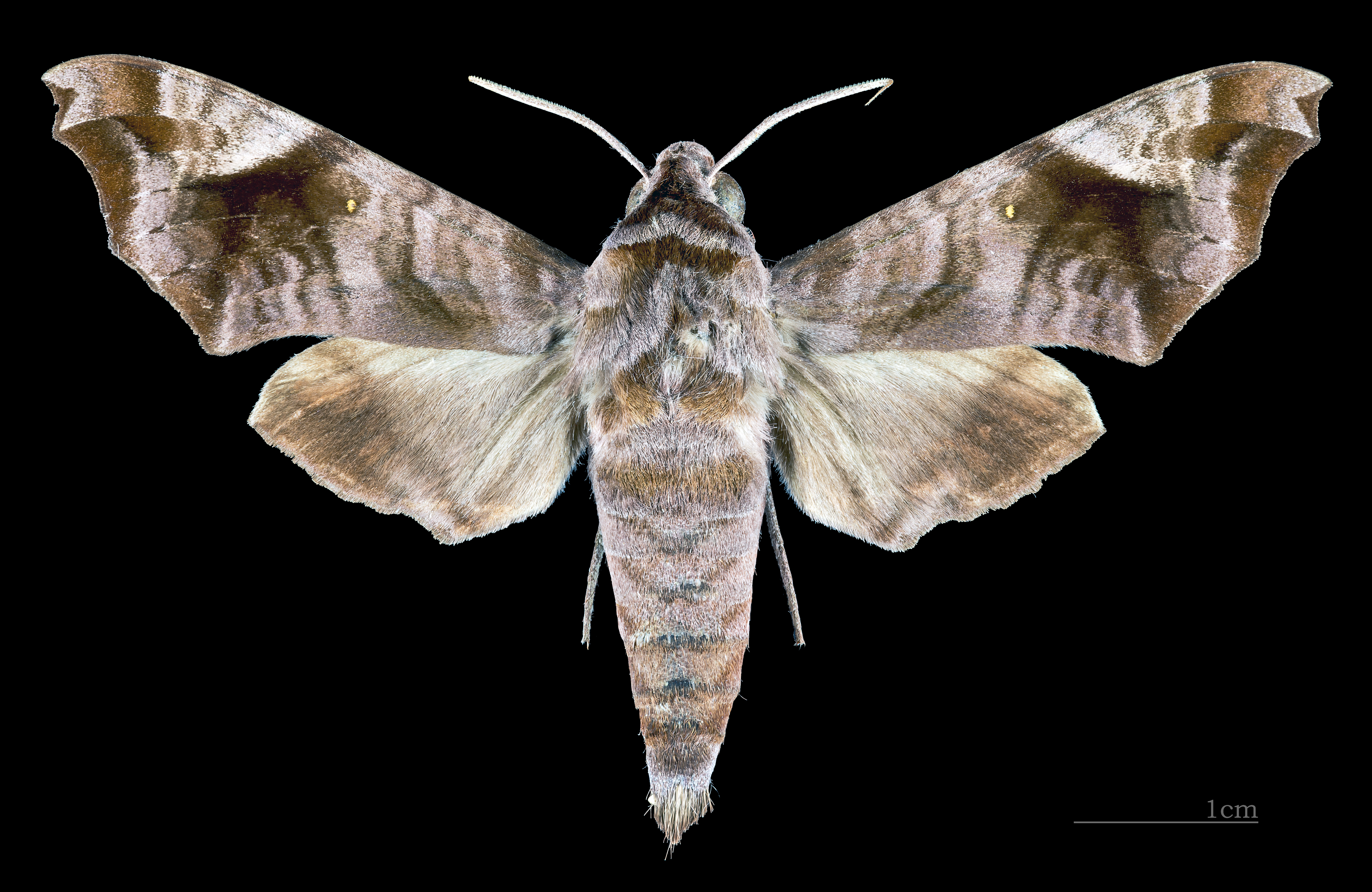
Acosmeryx anceus subdentata
Dorsal view of a male

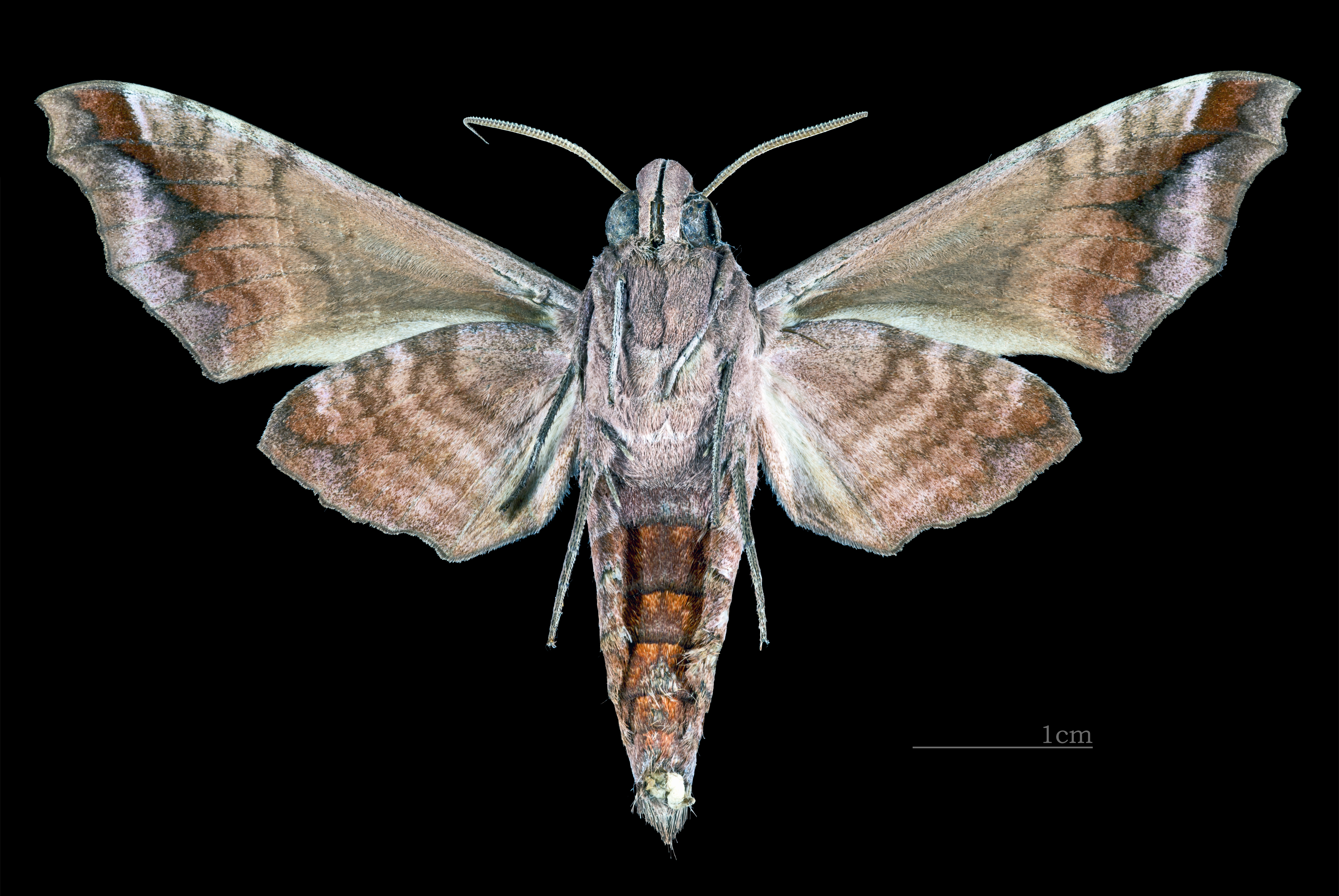
Acosmeryx anceus subdentata
Underside view of a male
