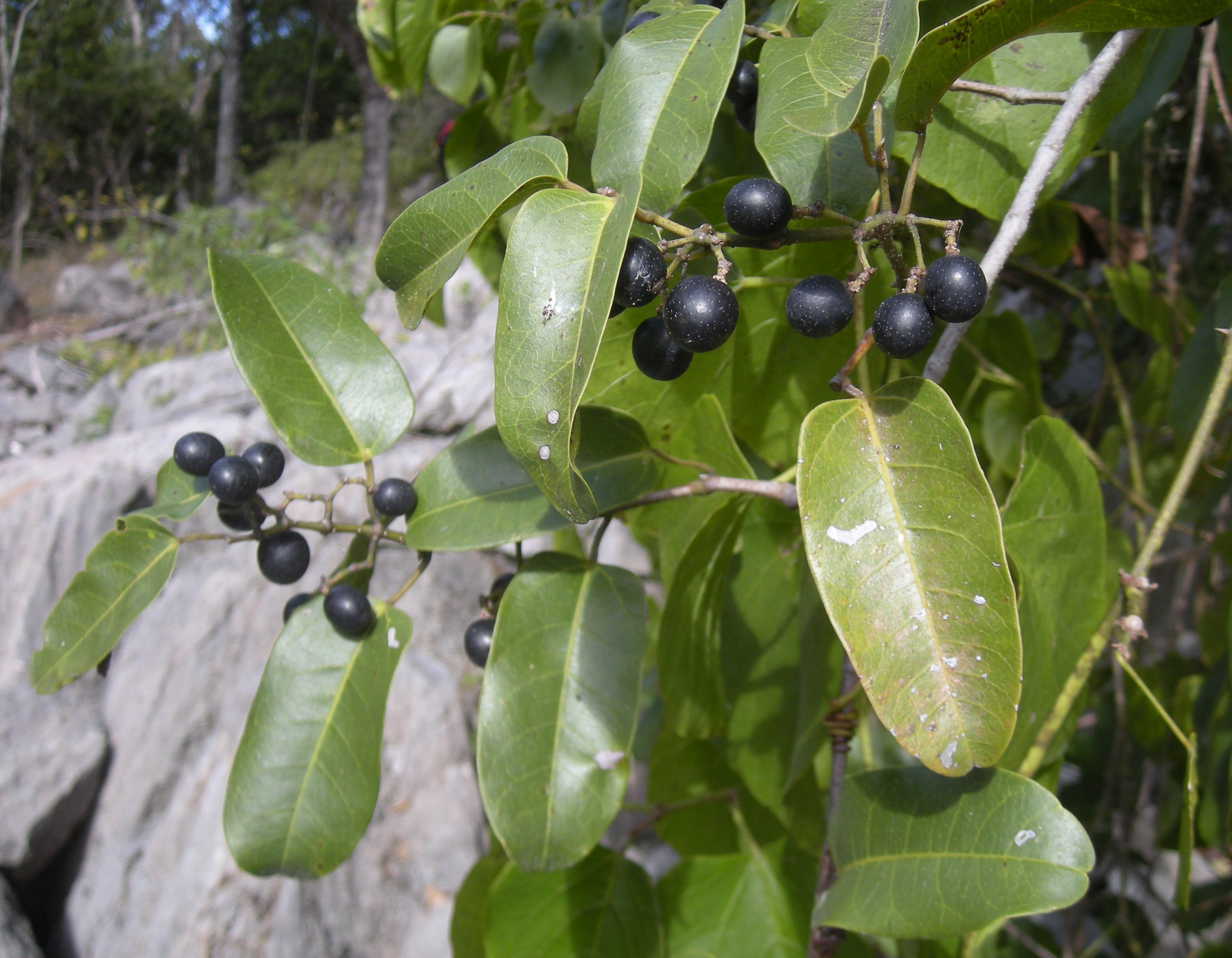

Conservation status
- Least Concern (NCA)

Scientific classification
- Kingdom: Plantae
- Clade: Tracheophytes
- Clade: Angiosperms
- Clade: Eudicots
- Clade: Rosids
- Order: Vitales
- Family: Vitaceae
- Genus: Apocissus
- Species: A. oblonga

Binomial name
- Apocissus oblonga (Benth.) Jackes & Trias-Blasi

Synonyms
- Cissus oblonga (Benth.) Planch.; Vitis oblonga Benth.

= Apocissus oblonga =

Species of vine

Apocissus oblonga is a species of vine in the grape family Vitaceae, native to eastern Queensland, Australia. It occurs from about 15° S to about 25° S, and inhabits vine thickets and monsoon forest. It was first described (as Vitis oblonga) by George Bentham in 1863.

== Taxonomy ==
The species was first described as Vitis oblonga by George Bentham in 1863. In 1887 Jules Émile Planchon placed it in the genus Cissus. In 2023 Betsy R. Jackes and Anna Trias-Blasi placed the species and six others in the new genus Apocissus.

As of April 2026, the revised name Apocissus oblonga is not accepted by the Australian National Herbarium or GBIF..
