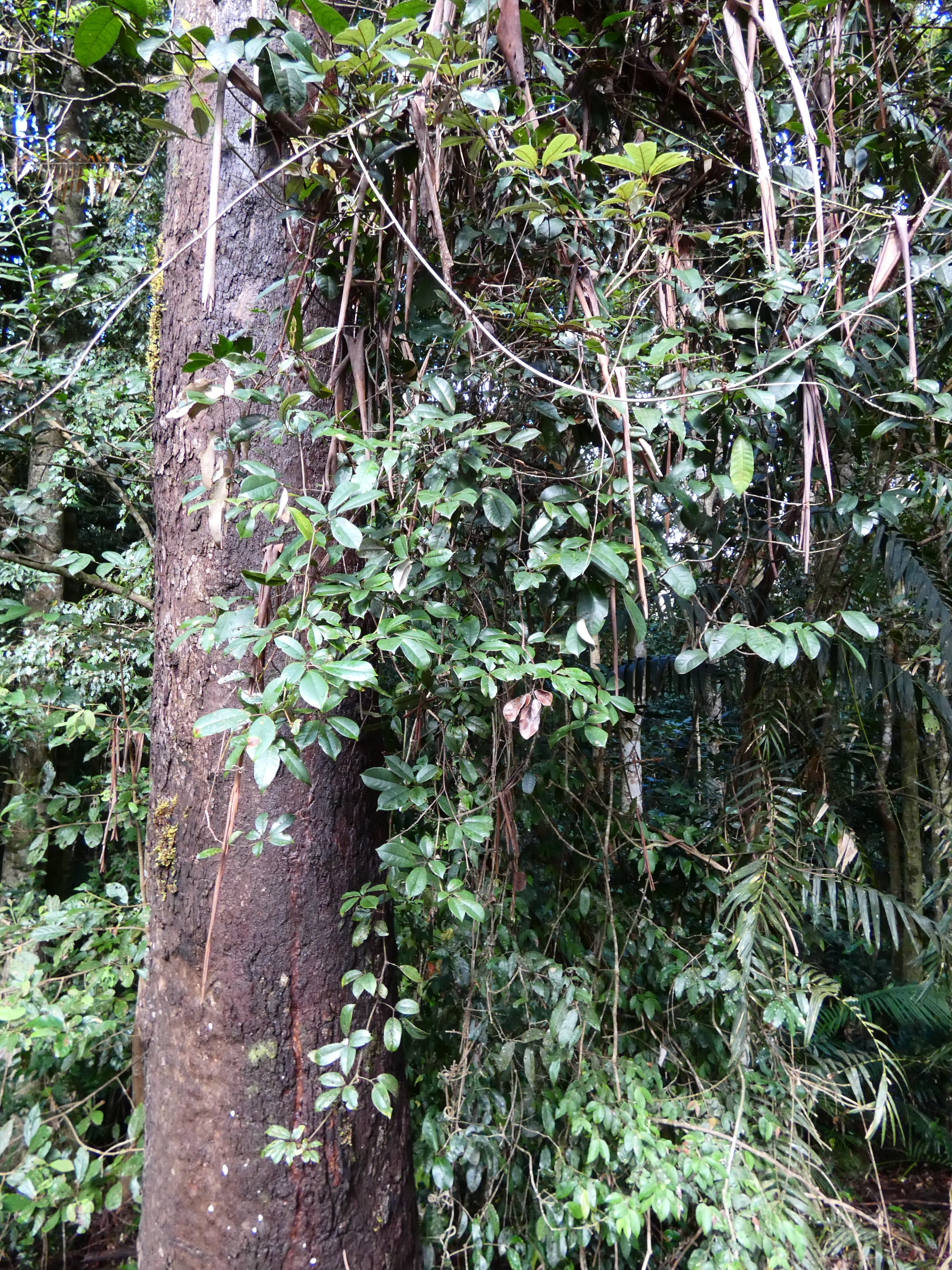
- Apocissus hypoglauca

Scientific classification
- Kingdom: Plantae
- Clade: Embryophytes
- Clade: Tracheophytes
- Clade: Angiosperms
- Clade: Eudicots
- Clade: Rosids
- Order: Vitales
- Family: Vitaceae
- Tribe: Cisseae
- Genus: Apocissus; Jackes & Trias-Blasi

Type species
- Apocissus antarctica (Vent.) Jackes & Trias-Blasi

Species
- 7; see text

= Apocissus =

Genus of flowering plants

Apocissus is a genus of flowering plants in the family Vitaceae. It includes seven species of climbing or scrambling vines, with six species native to New Guinea and Australia, and one species native to Central and South America.

The species in Apocissus were formerly placed in Cissus, a large genus with a wide distribution in the tropics and subtropics. They are distinguished from Cissus by the presence of domatia and/or ‘pouch-like' stipules. Jackes and Trias-Blasi (2023) concluded that Apocissus diverged from the core Cissus clade in the early Eocene, when South America and Australia were still connected via Antarctica.

== Species ==
Seven species are accepted.

- Apocissus acrantha (Lauterb.) Jackes & Trias-Blasi – New Guinea
- Apocissus antarctica (Vent.) Jackes & Trias-Blasi – eastern Australia
- Apocissus behrmannii (Lauterb.) Jackes & Trias-Blasi – New Guinea
- Apocissus hypoglauca (A.Gray) Jackes & Trias-Blasi – eastern and southeastern Australia
- Apocissus oblonga (Benth.) Jackes & Trias-Blasi – eastern Australia
- Apocissus sterculiifolia (F.Muell. ex Benth.) Jackes & Trias-Blasi – eastern Australia
- Apocissus trianae (Planch.) Jackes & Trias-Blasi – southern Mexico to Bolivia and southeastern Brazil
