= German International School Sydney =

- Deutsche Auslandsschule Sydney (German)

Location
- 33 Myoora Road, Terrey Hills NSW 2084; Terrey Hills, New South Wales; Australia; 33.6889°S 151.2198°E

Information
- Founded: 1989
- Grades: Preschool to Year 12
- Website: germanschoolsydney.com

German International School Sydney is a German international school in Terrey Hills, Sydney, New South Wales.

It serves from Preschool until IBDP Senior Secondary (Sekundarstufe II).

== Curriculum ==
The primary school, years 1–6, uses a German immersion programme. The secondary school has two divisions: a German stream and an English stream; 85% of the secondary students are in the German stream. Students in the English stream, making up the remainder of the students, take German classes.

Certain subjects are taught to all students in German, such as Year 8 Biology, while others are taught to all students in English, such as Year 8 Chemistry and Geography. Students from both streams take the same art and music classes.

== Operations ==
The school does not require its students to wear school uniforms. The tuition for the youngest students, as of 2014, is $10,000 Australian dollars. The tuition for students years 11 and 12, as of the same year, varies depending on the subjects chosen for the International Baccalaureate program. The highest possible annual tuition for a year 11 or 12 student is $20,000.

== Student body ==
As of 2014 the school has 230 students, with half of them being of a German background.

== See also ==
- German Australian
- Deutsche Schule Melbourne
