= Terrey Hills =

- Suburb
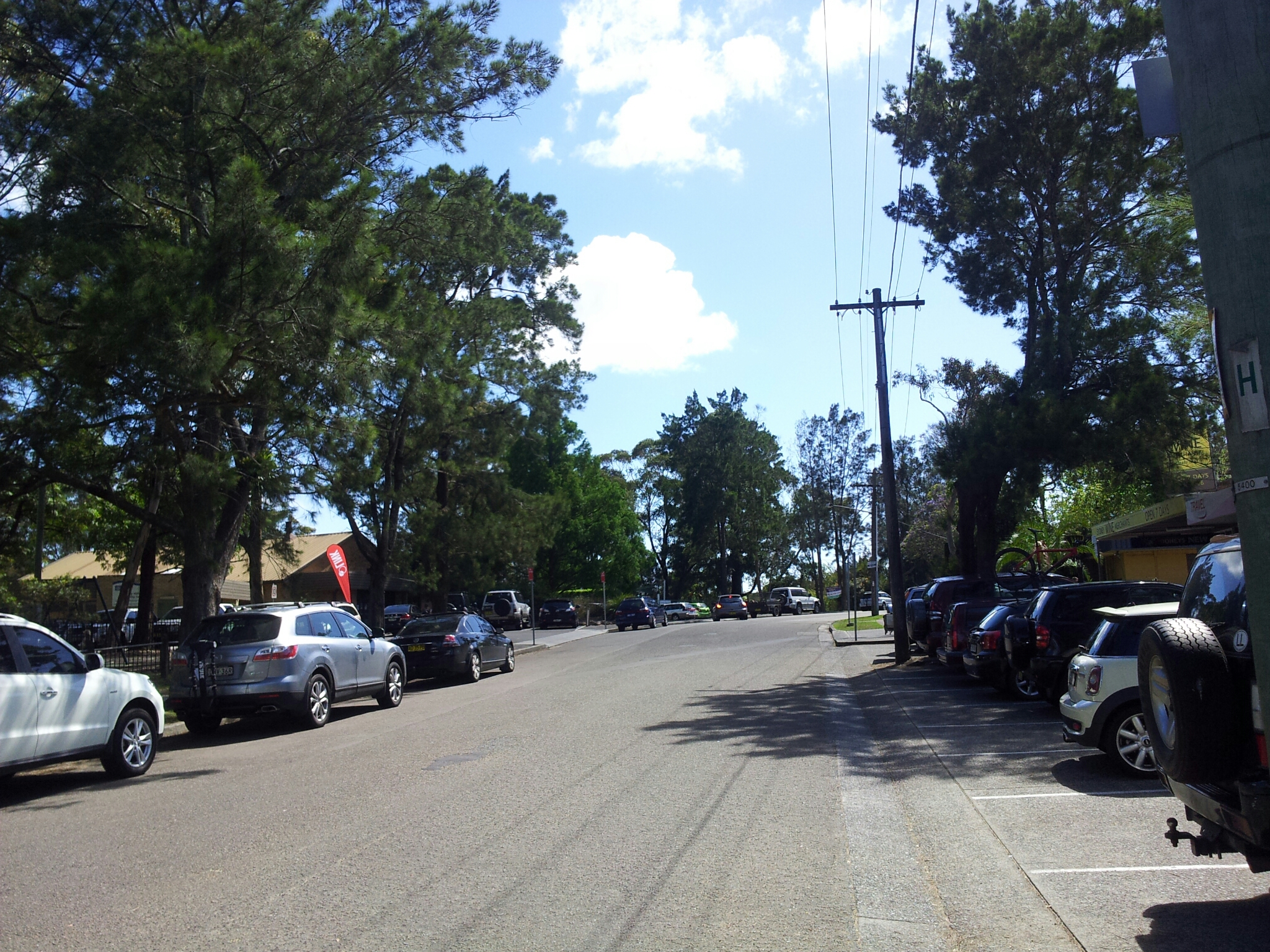
- Suburban street

- Interactive map of Terrey Hills
- Country: Australia
- State: New South Wales
- City: Sydney
- LGA: Northern Beaches Council
- Location: 25 km (16 mi) north of Sydney CBD

Government
  - State electorate: Pittwater
  - Federal division: Mackellar
- Elevation: 194 m (636 ft)

Population
  - Total: 3,142 (SAL 2021)
- Postcode: 2084
- Mean max temp: 21.8 °C (71.2 °F)
- Mean min temp: 13.2 °C (55.8 °F)
- Annual rainfall: 1,021 mm (40.2 in)
Suburbs around Terrey Hills
Duffys Forest	Ku-ring-gai Chase National Park
Ku-ring-gai Chase National Park	Terrey Hills	Ingleside
	Belrose	Belrose

Terrey Hills is a suburb of Northern Sydney, in the state of New South Wales, Australia 25 kilometres north of the Sydney central business district in the local government area of Northern Beaches Council. It is part of the Forest District and Northern Beaches region.

Terrey Hills is a very leafy suburb and in some areas semi-rural, with many people boarding their horses in the area. Terrey Hills owes its name to the two original land holders Samuel Hills and Obediah James Terrey. Obediah Terrey acquired 640 acres (2.6 km^{2}) in 1881 and Samuel Hills owned 100 acres (0.40 km^{2}) nearby.

The area was used by Indigenous people prior to European settlement, and rock carvings exist in some places. One set of carvings is located near Larool Road and depicts hunting scenes with kangaroos, human figures and footprints. Terrey Hills Post Office opened on 17 June 1935.

== History ==
For the older geological history, Terrey Hills is noted as the "laterite capital" of the Sydney Basin. The laterite of Terrey Hills was used for early road-making and also has been used for rock wall coastal defence at Collaroy Beach. It is the only place in New South Wales where fossils (meagre plant fibres) have been noted in laterite. The main laterite quarry (now the Terrey Hills playing field), and a smaller one at Tumbledown Dick, are on the National Estate (a Commonwealth heritage listing) and also have been nominated to the NSW Government local-significance heritage listing which in this area is administered by the Northern Beaches Council.

A small struggle has been ongoing for years to better protect the laterite exposure at Tumbledown Dick from the announced effects of Mona Vale road widening plans. The laterite was worked during the Great Depression when Australia had one third of the workforce out of work. The Warringah Shire Quarry or 'gravel pit' at Terrey Hills was an important place for the distribution of government relief work funding. Gai Halstead in 1988 wrote a bicentennial compilation which was sponsored by Dick Smith's "Australian Geographical" organisation which was then headquartered at Terrey Hills - "The story of Terry Hills and Duffys Forest".

In this it is noted that married men were given work at the rate of two weeks on and one off, whereas the single men worked at the 'gravel pit' at the rate of one week on and two off. Apart from this work there was little other work available at the time and Ms Halstead recorded the people at Terrey Hills were generally impoverished. For a week's work digging laterite gravel with pick and shovel there was received £1. To be paid that, they had to walk to the 'relief office' at Narrabeen. Besides digging the laterite, the relief workers based at Terrey Hills also built or improved the roads from Terrey Hills to Mona Vale, Cottage Point and Coal and Candle Creek. The area is generally poor in fossils and the only further thing of note is that a member of the local volunteer bush fire brigade found a fossil footprint in stone fallen from the bank of McCarr's Creek near the Duck Hole.

== Climate ==
Owing to its elevation and close proximity to the ocean, as well as its extensive tree canopy cover, the weather station at Terrey Hills records the mildest temperatures of any weather station in the Greater Sydney region. Under Köppen's scheme, the suburb has a borderline humid subtropical (Cfa) and oceanic climate (Cfb) with warm summers and cool winters.

Climate data for Terrey Hills
Month	Jan	Feb	Mar	Apr	May	Jun	Jul	Aug	Sep	Oct	Nov	Dec	Year
Record high °C (°F)	44.5 (112.1)	40.9 (105.6)	37.1 (98.8)	33.2 (91.8)	27.2 (81.0)	23.0 (73.4)	24.4 (75.9)	29.4 (84.9)	33.1 (91.6)	36.3 (97.3)	39.9 (103.8)	41.8 (107.2)	44.5 (112.1)
Mean daily maximum °C (°F)	26.6 (79.9)	25.9 (78.6)	24.8 (76.6)	22.3 (72.1)	19.4 (66.9)	16.5 (61.7)	16.4 (61.5)	18.0 (64.4)	20.8 (69.4)	22.6 (72.7)	23.9 (75.0)	25.6 (78.1)	21.9 (71.4)
Mean daily minimum °C (°F)	18.4 (65.1)	18.1 (64.6)	17.0 (62.6)	14.0 (57.2)	10.7 (51.3)	8.7 (47.7)	7.8 (46.0)	8.6 (47.5)	11.2 (52.2)	13.2 (55.8)	15.2 (59.4)	16.7 (62.1)	13.3 (55.9)
Record low °C (°F)	11.9 (53.4)	11.6 (52.9)	9.8 (49.6)	5.5 (41.9)	2.9 (37.2)	0.9 (33.6)	0.2 (32.4)	1.5 (34.7)	4.2 (39.6)	6.0 (42.8)	5.8 (42.4)	9.3 (48.7)	0.2 (32.4)
Average precipitation mm (inches)	109.4 (4.31)	139.3 (5.48)	175.0 (6.89)	120.5 (4.74)	59.5 (2.34)	126.0 (4.96)	74.8 (2.94)	57.5 (2.26)	63.1 (2.48)	82.6 (3.25)	97.3 (3.83)	84.8 (3.34)	1,195.7 (47.07)
Average precipitation days	15.1	14.3	15.3	13.6	9.5	13.8	10.9	9.1	9.9	11.9	12.4	12.3	148.1
Source 1: (averages, records and rain days)
Source 2: (rainfall amount)

== Commercial area ==
The shopping centre includes a Friendly Grocer supermarket, a Post Office, specialty shops and a number of restaurants and landscaping and plant suppliers.

Northern Beaches Council has its Volunteer Services Centre located in Thompson Drive. Terrey Hills is home to the Rural Fire Service (RFS), State Emergency Service (SES), Marine Rescue NSW were until recently also located here but have recently relocated their radio room to a new facility in Belrose [nearby], the Citizens Radio Emergency Services Team (CREST) & the Wireless Institute Civil Emergency Network (WICEN) under the auspices of the Radio Society (MWRS).

In addition Terrey Hills has its own Rural Fire Brigade Station located in the car park adjacent to the Frank Beckman Reserve on Yulong Avenue. The volunteer brigade is the primary fire-fighting agency for the village and is equipped to fight both bush fires and structural / car fires. Currently equipped with three firefighting and one support vehicles:

- "Terrey Hills Pumper" An Izuzu Category 10 4x2 urban appliance
- "Terrey Hills 1" An Izuzu Category 1 4x4 heavy bush fire tanker
- "Terrey Hills 9' A Toyota Lancruiser, ultra light tanker
- "Terrey Hills PC" A Toyota Hilux support vehicle.

Terrey Hills is also home to the Manly-Warringah Media Co-Operative and the Radio Northern Beaches radio stations after its relocation from Belrose in 2013.

Terrey Hills is the location of the NSW Government's Bureau of Meteorology Australia's weather radars for the Sydney Region. The radar is close to the intersection of Mona Vale Road and Forest Way.

== Transport ==
Terrey Hills is well served by buses and is also home to a CDC NSW (formerly Forest Coach Lines) depot. Bus services operate to the CBD (L70 & 270), Chatswood (283 / 284), Gordon (196), Macquarie Park (197), North Sydney (260), Mona Vale (196 /197), Manly (141) and the special event service to Sydney Olympic Park. The buses to Chatswood and Gordon stop at the railway stations, enabling passengers to access train services.

Mona Vale Road is the main road through Terrey Hills, connecting it to the rest of the Northern Beaches to the east, and suburbs such as Chatswood, Hornsby and North Ryde to the south and west. There is an intersection on this road with Forest Way, linking the suburb with the rest of the Forest district.

== Education ==
Terrey Hills is home to five schools:

- Northern Beaches Christian School
- The Sydney Japanese School
- Terrey Hills Public School
- Kinma School
- German International School Sydney

== Sport and recreation ==
There are also sporting facilities including two golf courses, two tennis centres with numerous courts available, and several BMX tracks where competitions and races are held. Rotary International had a branch in Terrey Hills that used to meet regularly at one of the local restaurants. There is also a skatepark located in Terrey Oval which opened in 2018 and was built on a previous half pipe which existed until 2010.

The Manly-Warringah Radio Society (VK2MB), the local northern beaches Amateur Radio club, has its meetings at the Terrey Hills Girl Guides hall every Wednesday evening.

The Terrey Hills Wolves are the local Rugby Union Club. They play in the Sydney Suburban Rugby sixth division Meldrum Cup competition. Their clubhouse is on the club's home ground, Yulong Oval. The local soccer team is The Belrose Terrey Hills Raiders.

== Gallery ==
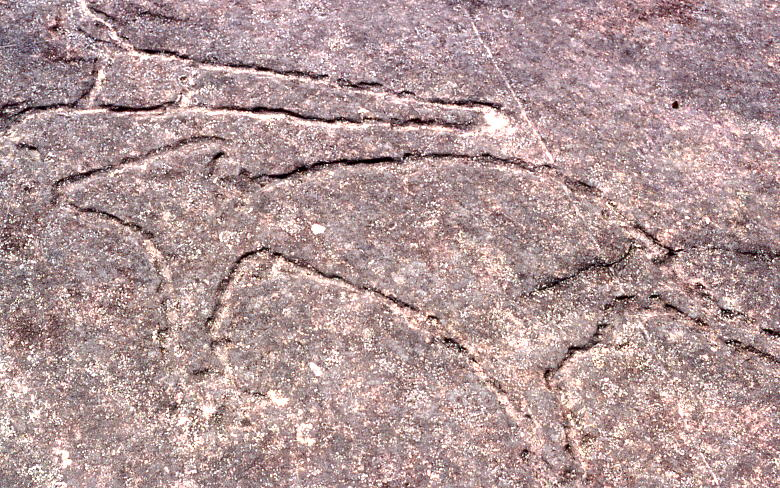
This image and following: Aboriginal rock carvings, Larool Road

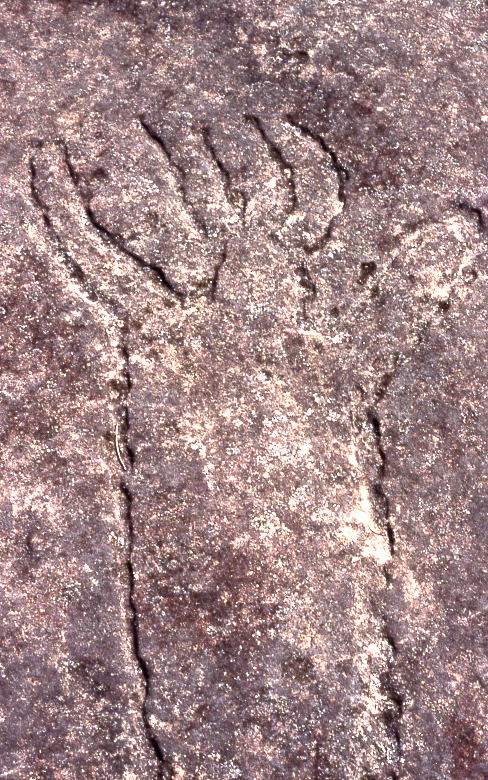

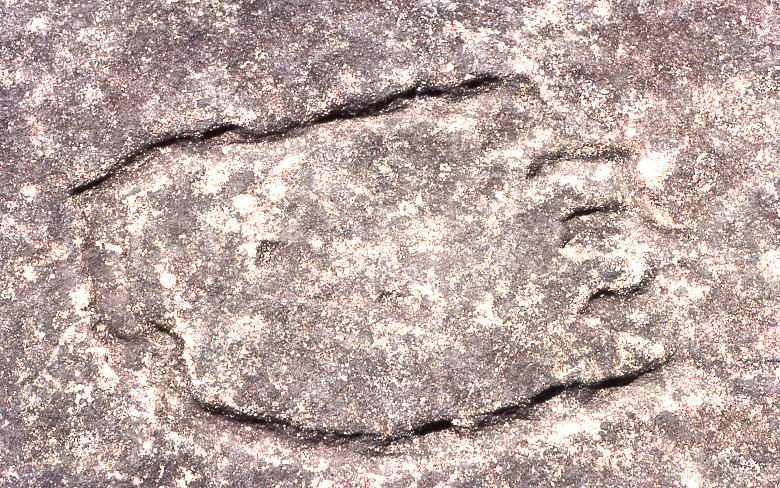
