= Northern Beaches Christian School =

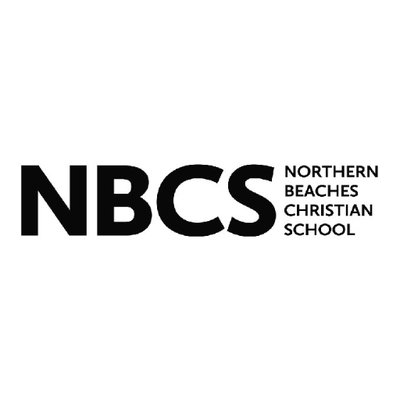

Location
- Terrey Hills, Sydney; Australia; 33°40′27″S 151°12′07″E

Information
- Type: Independent co-educational early learning, primary and secondary day school
- Denomination: Non-denominational Christian
- Established: 1981; 45 years ago
- Educational authority: NSW Department of Education
- Principal: Tim Watson
- Employees: 150
- Grades: K–12
- Enrolment: 1,175 (2023)
- Colour: Navy blue
- Website: nbcs.nsw.edu.au

Northern Beaches Christian School is an independent non-denominational Christian co-educational primary and secondary day school, located in Terrey Hills, Sydney, Australia.

Established in 1981, the school enrols approximately 1,200 students from Pre-K to Year 12.

== Curriculum ==
NBCS Pre-K follows a curriculum that combines Early Years Learning Framework (EYLF) and the NSW Early Stage 1 Curriculum. It includes a bush kindy program.

All students in Years 1 and 2 learn violin or cello in small group lessons. Woodwind instruments are added in Years 3 and 4.

Students graduate from Year 12 after studying the NSW HSC curriculum.

== Modern architectural buildings ==
The school completed its multi-purpose hall named after Australian actress Marina Prior in 2009 and its three-storey STEM Centre in 2024. Its modern buildings were designed sustainably and have won several architectural awards.

== Programs and opportunities ==
In Secondary, the camps program allows students to choose the activity of their preference during camp week. Groups of students from Year 8 to Year 11 can choose from activities like scuba diving, mountain biking, surfing, golf, photography and more.

The school has a Global Opportunities Program which aims to build global bridges through community partnership, cultural understanding and shared learning. Secondary students can choose from study tours, language immersions, service and sports tours.

== Musical theatre ==
NBCS stages a Broadway musical every year. Previous years' musicals include Mary Poppins, Mamma Mia, and Bring it On. Students can participate in cast and crew.

== Notable alumni ==
- Callum Mills – Australian rules football player for the Sydney Swans
- Jacob Preston – rugby league player for the Canterbury-Bankstown Bulldogs; former Year 6 school captain

== See also ==
- List of non-government schools in New South Wales
