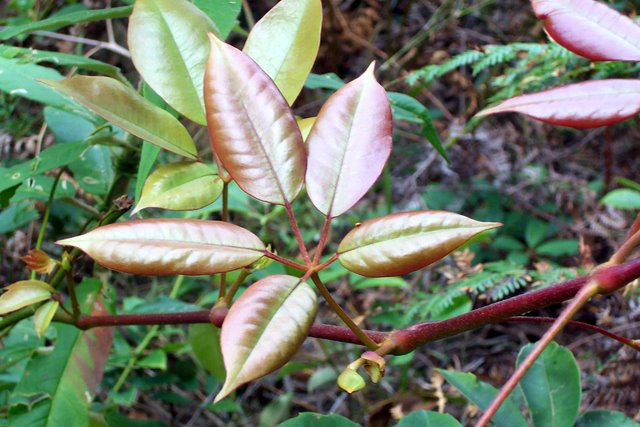
- Apocissus hypoglauca - young leaves at Brisbane Water National Park, Australia

Scientific classification
- Kingdom: Plantae
- Clade: Tracheophytes
- Clade: Angiosperms
- Clade: Eudicots
- Clade: Rosids
- Order: Vitales
- Family: Vitaceae
- Genus: Apocissus
- Species: A. hypoglauca

Binomial name
- Apocissus hypoglauca (A.Gray) Jackes & Trias-Blasi

Synonyms
- Cissus australasica F.Muell.; Cissus hypoglauca A.Gray (1854) (basionym); Nothocissus hypoglauca (A.Gray) Latiff; Vitis hypoglauca (A.Gray) F.Muell.

= Apocissus hypoglauca =

Water vine

Species of vine endemic to Australia

Apocissus hypoglauca (synonym Cissus hypoglauca) is a common Australian vine. It is one of the better known climbing plants of the genus Apocissus in the grape family. A very common climber in moist areas of eastern Australia, it often colonises large areas after forest damage due to storms, fire or logging. Common names include jungle grape, water vine, giant water vine, five-leaf water vine, jungle vine, native grapes and billangai.

The species was first described in 1854 by American botanist Asa Gray. In 2023 Betsy R. Jackes and Anna Trias-Blasi placed the species in the new genus Apocissus.

== Description ==
Apocissus hypoglauca is a large woody vine. The name water-vine comes from the fact that the woody sections of the vine may be cut into sections and the sap that drips from the sections may be drunk as water. The leaves are palmate, and are usually arranged in a group of five. Leaves elliptic or ovate in shape, slightly toothed or entire. Mid green above and a glaucous shade underneath, and measure 3 to 15 cm (1–6 in) long, 1.5 to 4 cm (0.6-1.6 in) wide. The young leaves are reddish and hairy. Tendrils appear opposite the leaf stalk.

Yellow flowers occur on terminal umbels, mostly in spring and summer. A purple globose fruit matures in the middle of the year. Five leaf Water Vine provides abundant food and shelter for birds and small animals. The stunning blue berries may be eaten raw and provide a delicious watery snack but do leave an acrid aftertaste that can be slightly irritating.

== Gallery ==
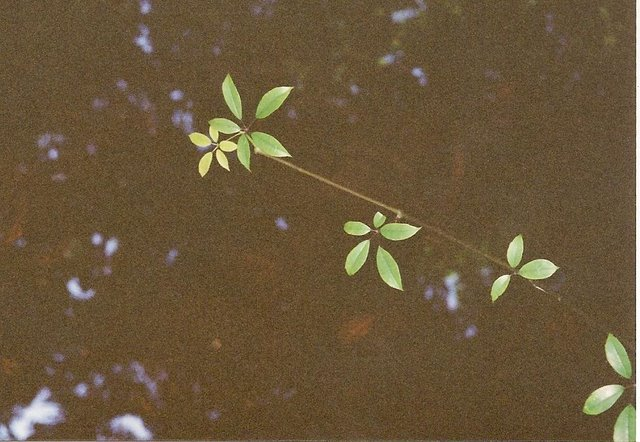
Apocissus hypoglauca growing over a creek at Murramarang National Park, Australia

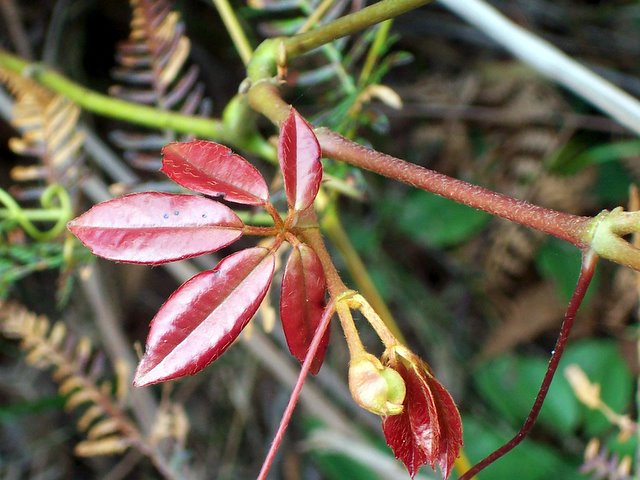
young leaves of Apocissus hypoglauca at Brisbane Water National Park, Australia

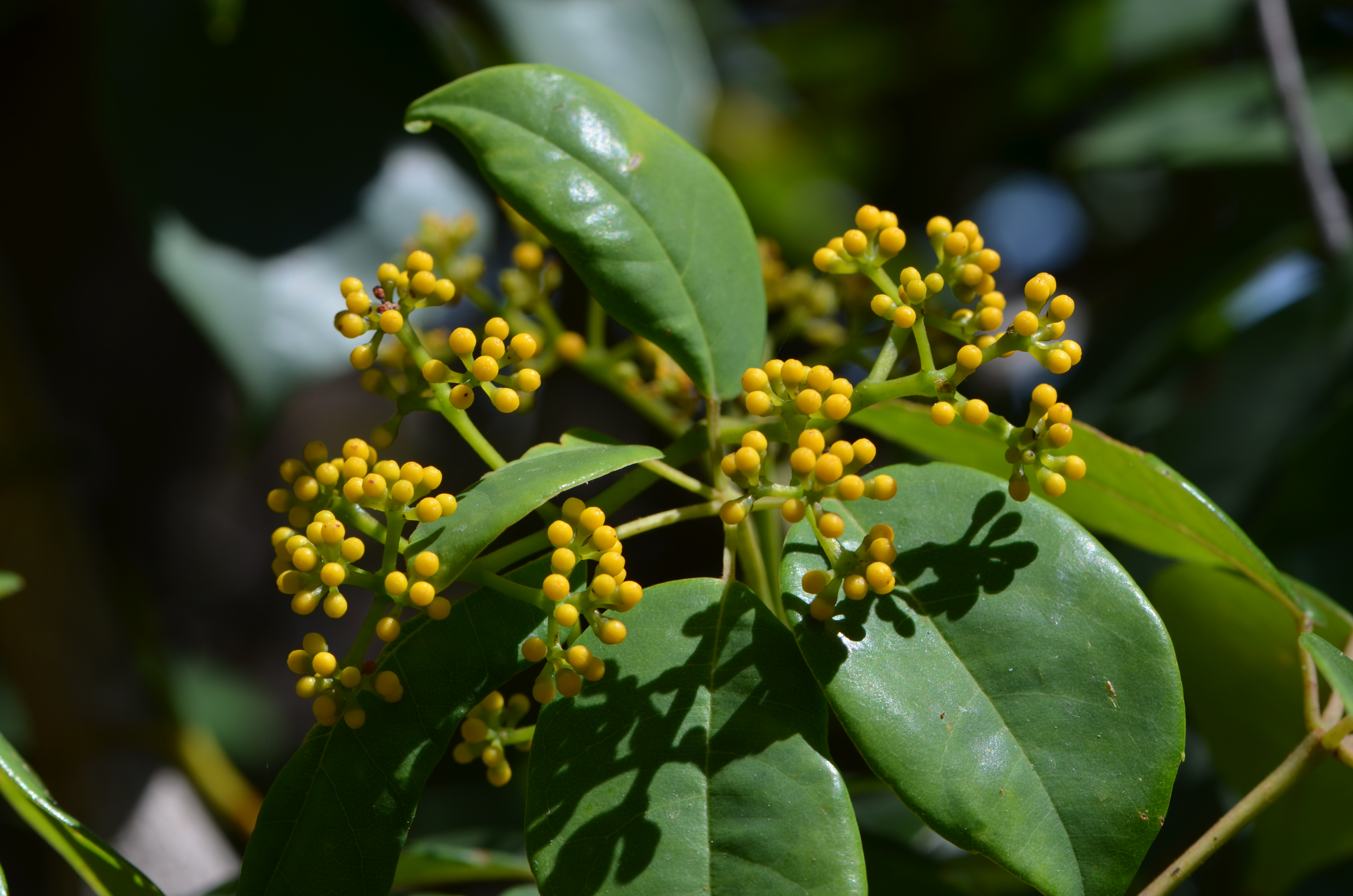
Fruit (McKay Reserve, Palm Beach, New South Wales)

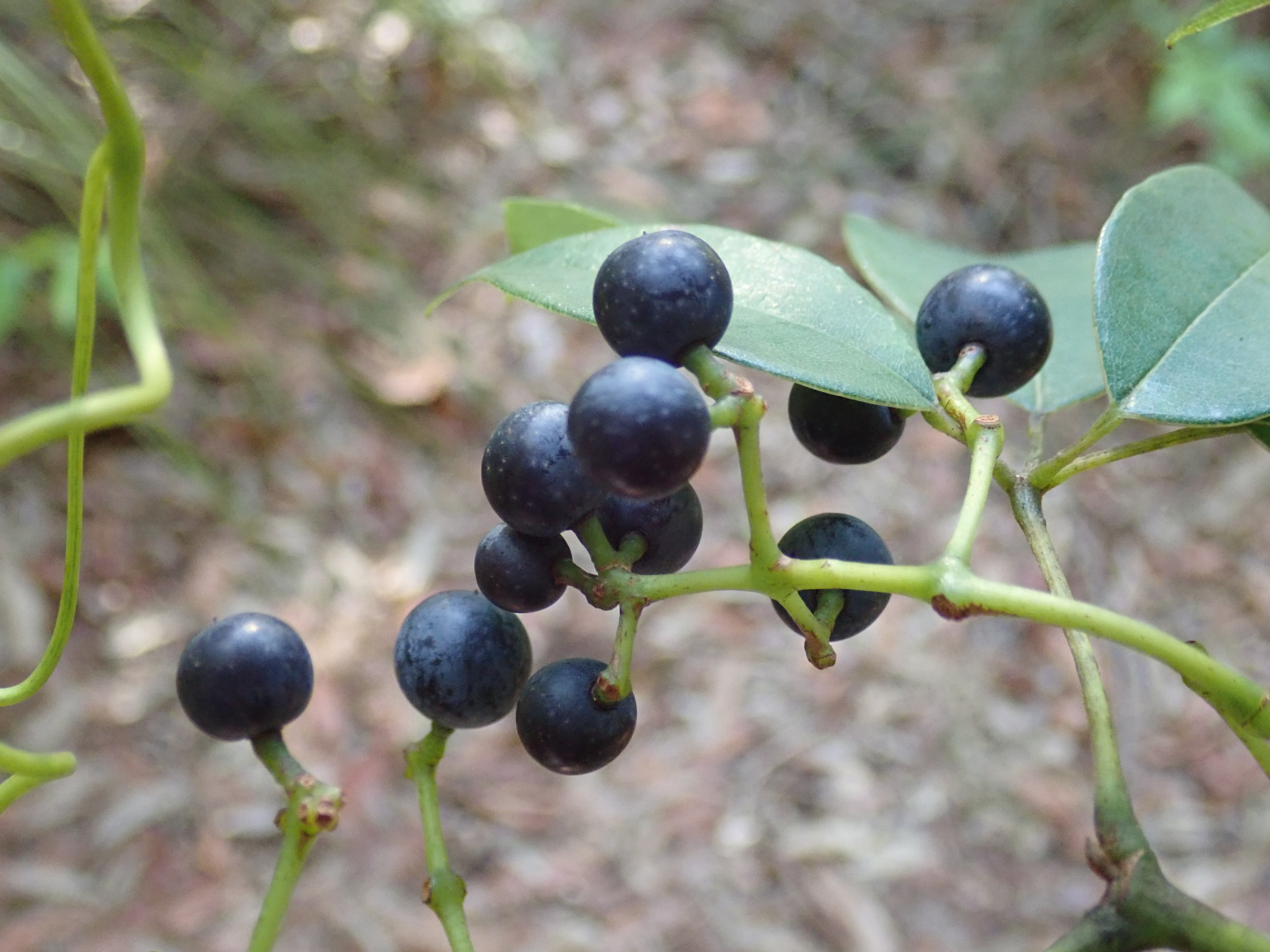
Fruit (McKay Reserve, Palm Beach, New South Wales)
