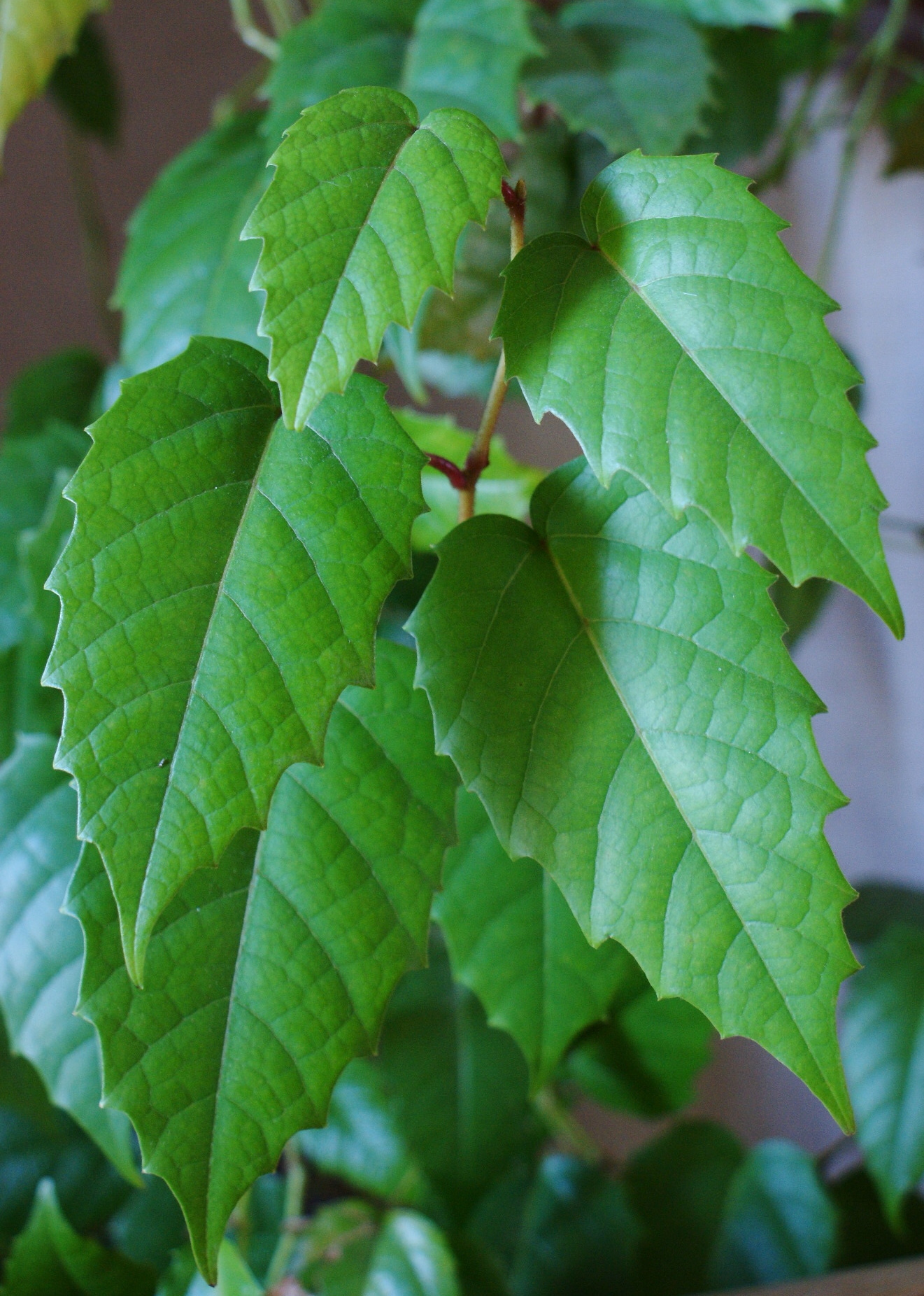

Conservation status
- Least Concern (NCA)

Scientific classification
- Kingdom: Plantae
- Clade: Tracheophytes
- Clade: Angiosperms
- Clade: Eudicots
- Clade: Rosids
- Order: Vitales
- Family: Vitaceae
- Genus: Apocissus
- Species: A. antarctica

Binomial name
- Apocissus antarctica (Vent.) Jackes & Trias-Blasi

Synonyms
- 10 synonyms: Cissus antarctica Vent. (basionym); Cissus antarctica var. integerrima Domin; Cissus antarctica var. pubescens Domin; Cissus baudiniana Brouss. ex DC.; Cissus bodiniana Brouss.; Cissus glandulosa Poir.; Vitis antarctica (Vent.) Benth.; Vitis baudiniana F.Muell.; Vitis kanguruh DC.; Vitis lucida Fisch. ex Steud.

= Apocissus antarctica =

Species of vine

Apocissus antarctica, formerly known as Cissus antarctica and commonly known as kangaroo vine or water vine, is a species of plant in the grape family Vitaceae. It is a climbing plant, native to and common on the east coast of Australia, often grown as a houseplant. It was first described in 1803.

== Description ==
=== Stem and foliage ===
Apocissus antarctica is a tendril climber with a recorded stem diameter of up to 8 cm (3.1 in). Most parts of the plant (stipules, leaf undersides, twigs, petioles, tendrils and inflorescences) are covered in rusty brown hairs. The leaves are simple, i.e. without divisions, and ovate to oblong, and attached to the twigs with a petiole up to 4 cm (1.6 in) long. The leaf blades measure up to 13 cm (5.1 in) long and 5 cm (2.0 in) wide, the apex may be pointed or rounded and the base cordate. When mature the top surface is hairless and the lower surface is softly hairy (pubescent). The margins are serrate.

=== Flowers ===
The inflorescences are panicles emerging from the twigs opposite a leaf, up to 3 cm (1.2 in) long, the ultimate segments umbellate and crowded. The flowers are about 5 mm (0.20 in) diameter with pale yellow petals about 2 mm (0.08 in) long.

=== Fruit ===
The fruit is a near-spherical berry about 12 mm (0.47 in) in diameter. At maturity they are dark blue/purple or black, and usually contain two seeds.

== Taxonomy ==
This plant was first described by French botanist Étienne Pierre Ventenat, as Cissus antarctica, in his 1803 book Choix de plantes : dont la plupart sont cultivées dans le jardin de Cels. In 2023, botanists Betsy Rivers Jackes and Anna Trias-Blasi published a paper in which some species of Cissus, including C. antarctica, were moved to their newly erected genus Apocissus to help resolve polyphyletic issues in the older genus.

In Australia, the new taxon has not been accepted in the Australian Plant Census, but both the Queensland and New South Wales herbaria have accepted it.

=== Etymology ===
The former generic name Cissus is derived from the Greek word for ivy, κισσος (kissos); the prefix apo-, meaning 'away from', was added by Jackes and Trias-Blasi to indicate that the new genus is distinct from the former. The species epithet antarctica refers to the southern distribution of the plant.

== Distribution and habitat ==
It grows in rainforest, occurring along almost the entire east coast of Australia, from the region near Cooktown in northeast Queensland to Eden in southeast New South Wales. In the most northern part of its distribution the altitudinal range is from 700 to 1,000 m (2,300 to 3,300 ft).

== Conservation ==
This species is listed as least concern under the Queensland Government's Nature Conservation Act. As of October 2025, it has not been assessed by the International Union for Conservation of Nature (IUCN).

== Ecology ==
The fruit of this species are eaten by fruit bats and numerous bird species.

== Cultivation ==
Apocissus antarctica is commonly grown in gardens and indoors. It may be grown as a hedge, over a frame such a fence or trellis, or allowed to scramble across the ground.

== Uses ==
The berries were eaten by Australian Aborigines, and water was extracted from the young vine stems.

== Gallery ==
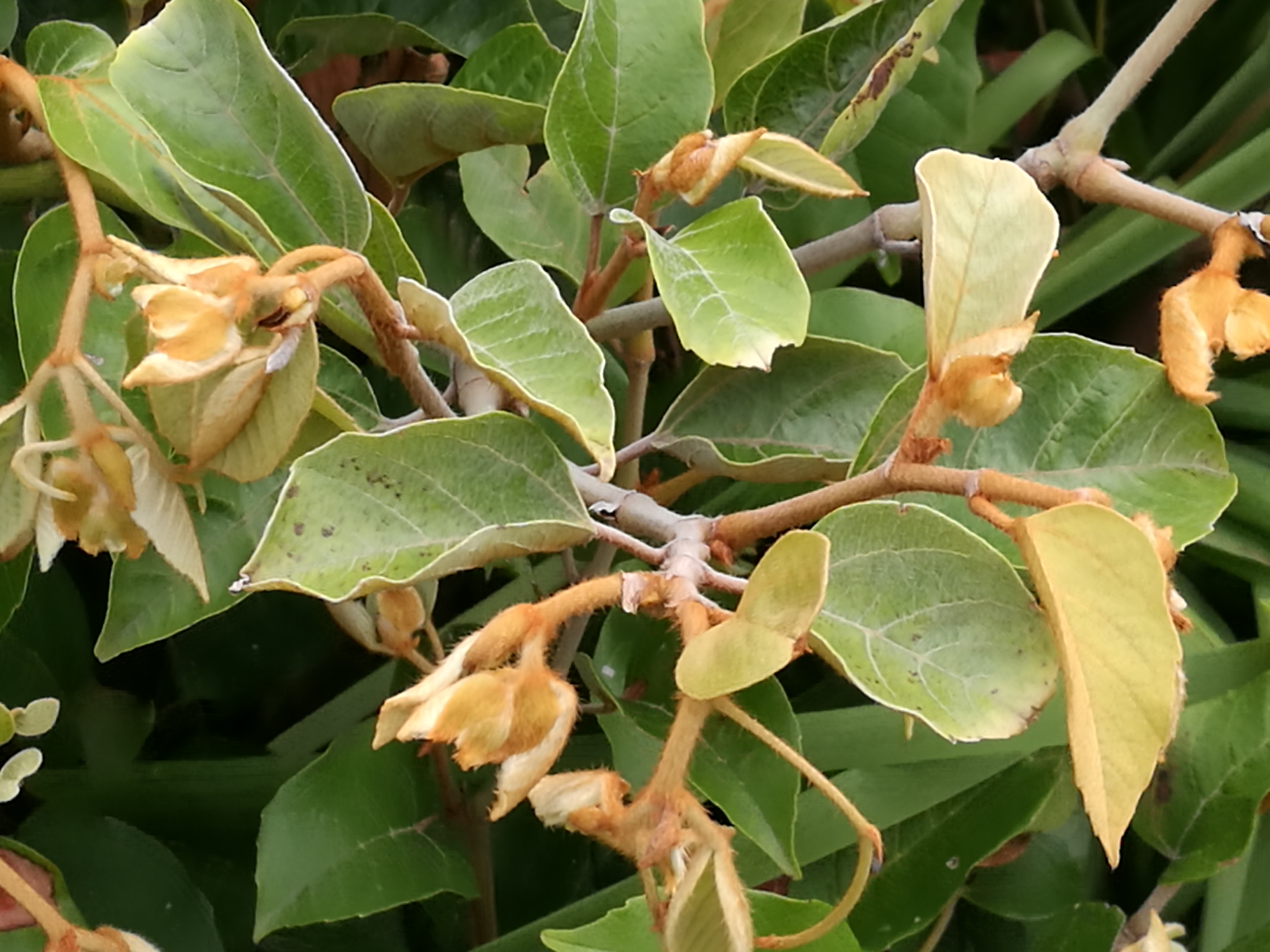
New growth

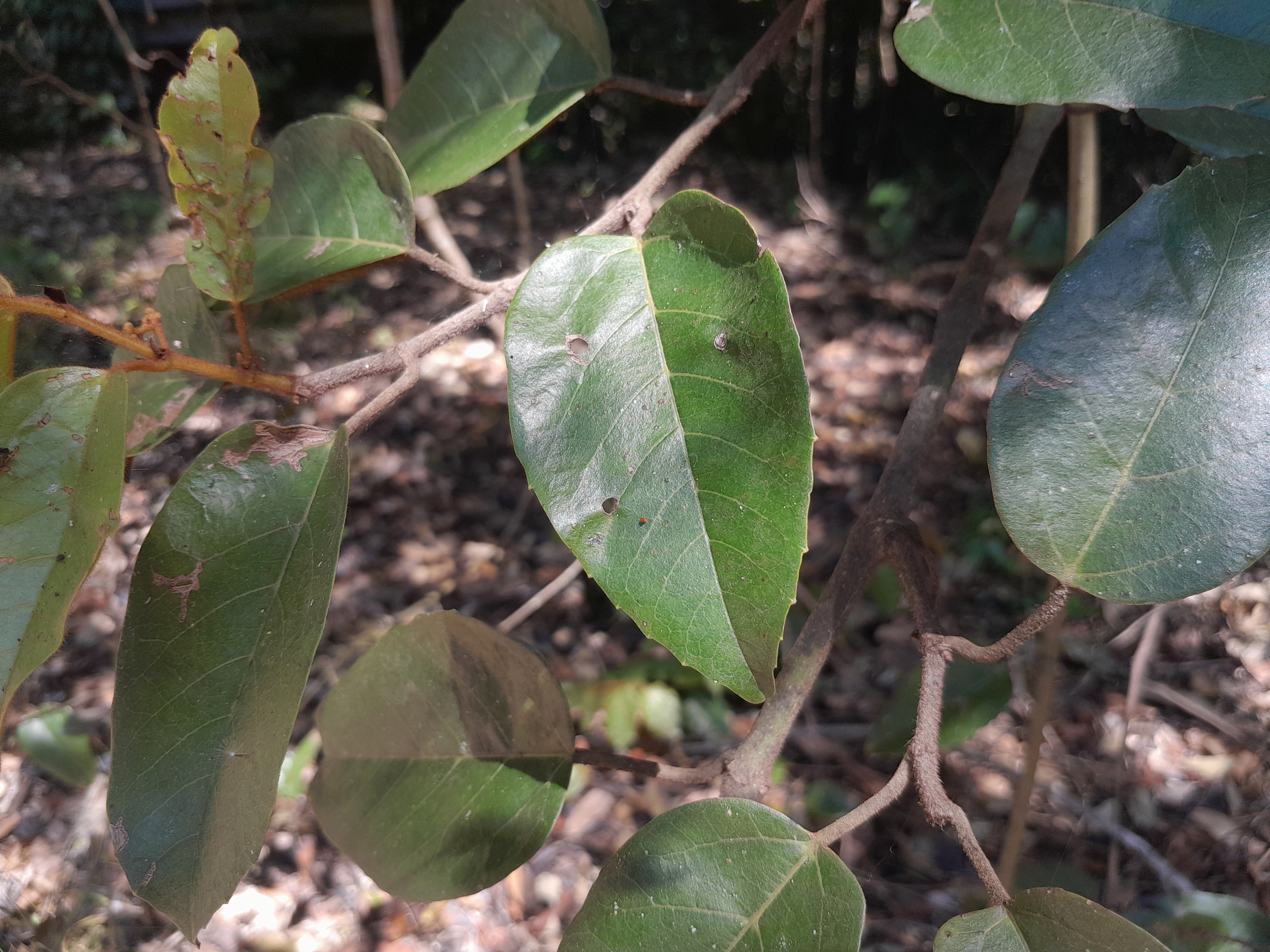
Mature foliage

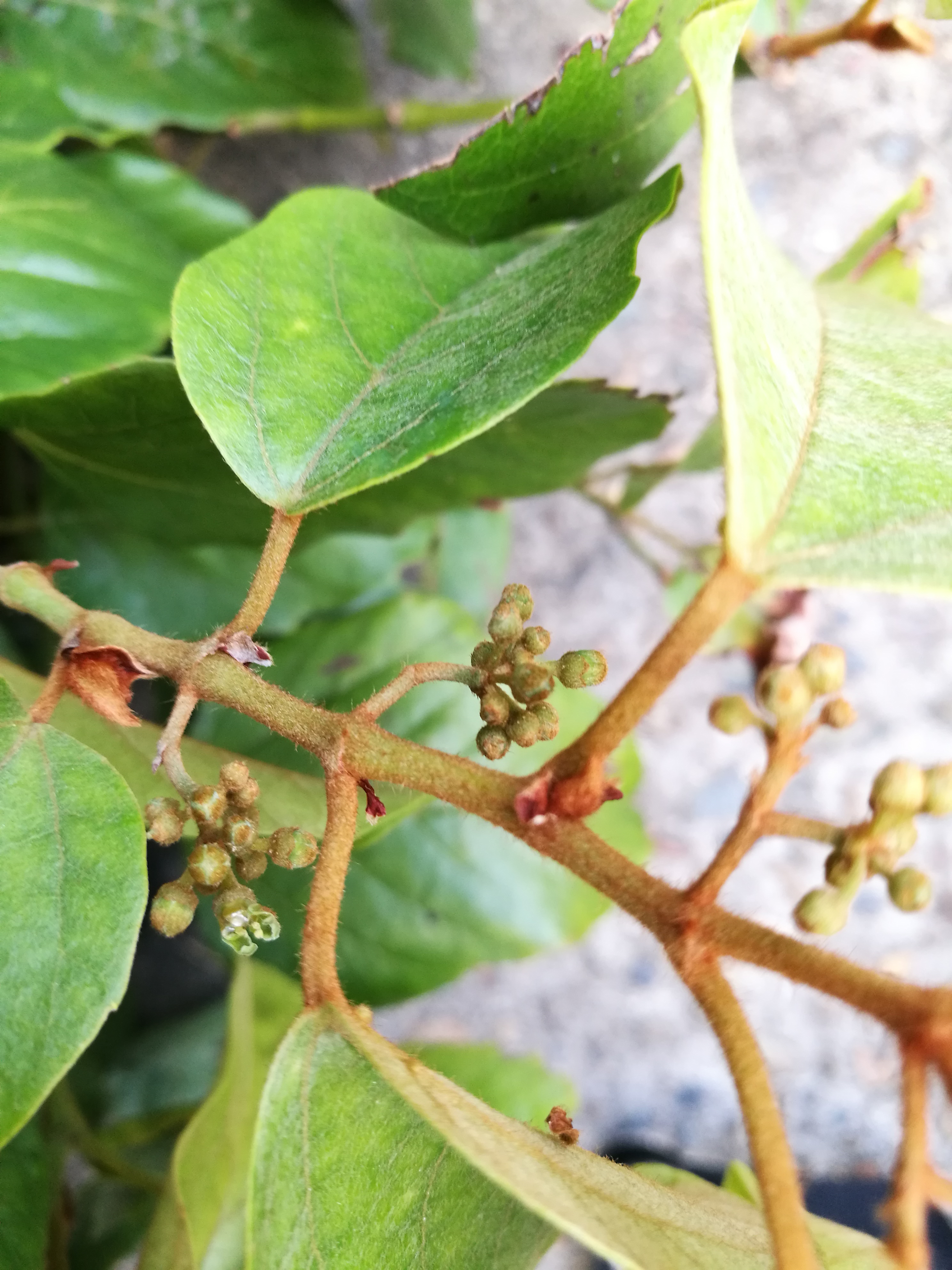
Flowers

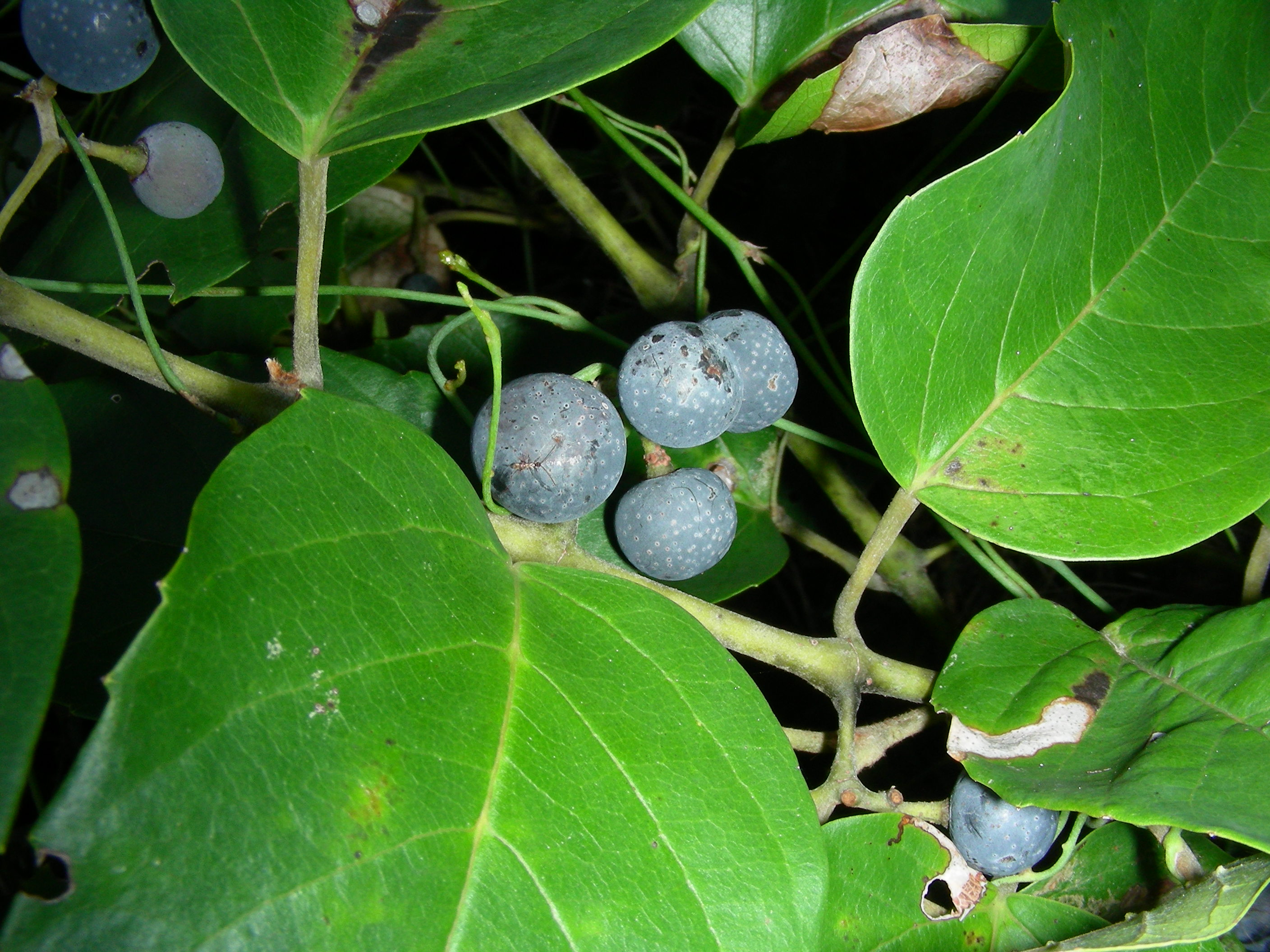
Fruit
