= International Lighthouse and Lightship Weekend =

Annual event

The International Lighthouse and Lightship Weekend (ILLW) is an annual event held on the third full weekend of August each year. The event was the brainchild of John Forsyth and Mike Dalrymple who were members of the Ayr Amateur Radio Group in Scotland. The event, which started in 1998, has developed into an international gathering of amateur radio operators from an estimated 95 countries.

Concurrent with this event, the Association of Lighthouse Keepers conducts their Lighthouse Heritage Weekend whereby lighthouse managers and keepers all around the world are encouraged to open their doors to the public for a viewing of their lighthouse and its history.

The event is currently managed by an Australian amateur radio operator, Kevin Mulcahy (call VK2CE), who has been involved since 1998, and who now owns the domain name and web site. A small team of volunteers assist in the running of the weekend activity. Major amateur radio organizations such as the Radio Society of Great Britain, the Amateur Radio Relay League of America, and the Wireless Institute of Australia support and promote the weekend which accounts for the many participating countries each year.

== Objective ==
The objective of the ILLW event is stated as "to promote public awareness of lighthouses and lightships and their need for preservation and restoration, to promote amateur radio and to foster International goodwill."

A classic example of what should not be allowed to happen to a lighthouse is shown here on YouTube featuring the lighthouse remains on Culebrita Island in Puerto Rico. Many of these magnificent structures are suffering from neglect and vandalism and it is the function of this event to make people aware of the need to conserve these historic aids to navigation before their existence is lost.

== Format ==
The basic format of the event is that members of a local amateur radio club or a licensed individual will set up a radio station either in, or near to, a lighthouse. They will then operate from that station over the whole or part of the weekend. The goal is to contact other amateur stations, particularly those operating from other lighthouse sites. Visiting public are invited to watch the operators and even use the equipment under supervision while visiting the lighthouse. YouTube has numerous video clips about the weekend which have been submitted by participants.
