= Manufaktura, Museum of the Factory =

Museum in Lodz, Poland

Coordinates: 51.7807°N 19.4435°E

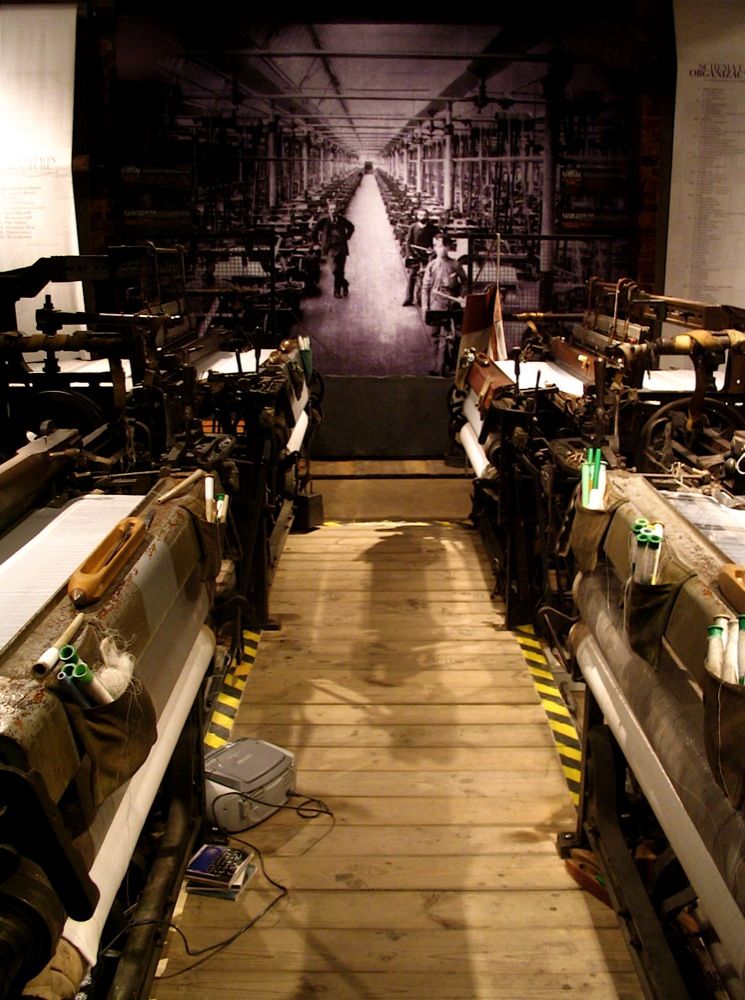

The Muzeum Fabryki, (Manufaktura, Museum of the Factory) is a museum in Łódź, Poland. The museum is an Anchor point on the European Route of Industrial Heritage.

== Context ==
The Muzeum Fabryki (Factory Museum) is situated within the Manufaktura complex which was built on the 30-hectare site of the industrialist Izrael Poznański. He followed the example of the Lancashire mill owners proving houses and a church and a hospital on-site for his workers. Poznański was a master weaver, by making a good marriage he was able to start employing weavers in cottages he provided. In 1872 he built his first steam driven weaving shed for power looms on Ogrodowa street. Two storey workers' houses followed. By 1878 he had a house on the corner of Ogrodowa and Zachodnia streets; his new spinning mill was expanded from 3600 spindles to 50,000 spindles. In 1900, he died and his son Ignacy Poznański took over. By 1903 the original tenement house was rebuilt in the form of the new Izrael Poznański Palace. World War I stopped the expansion, and the interwar years were financially difficult. During World War I the factories were occupied, and on its conclusion the state nationalised the asset. The factories closed in 1992.

== Museum ==
Muzeum Fabryki tells the history of the industrial fortune of Poznański. It shows how the factory developed in time, the production techniques for cotton cloth and the everyday lives of the ordinary factory workers.

== See also ==
- Manufaktura
