= Izrael Poznański Palace =

Historic property in Łódź, Poland

Izrael Poznański Palace Pałac Izraela Poznańskiego
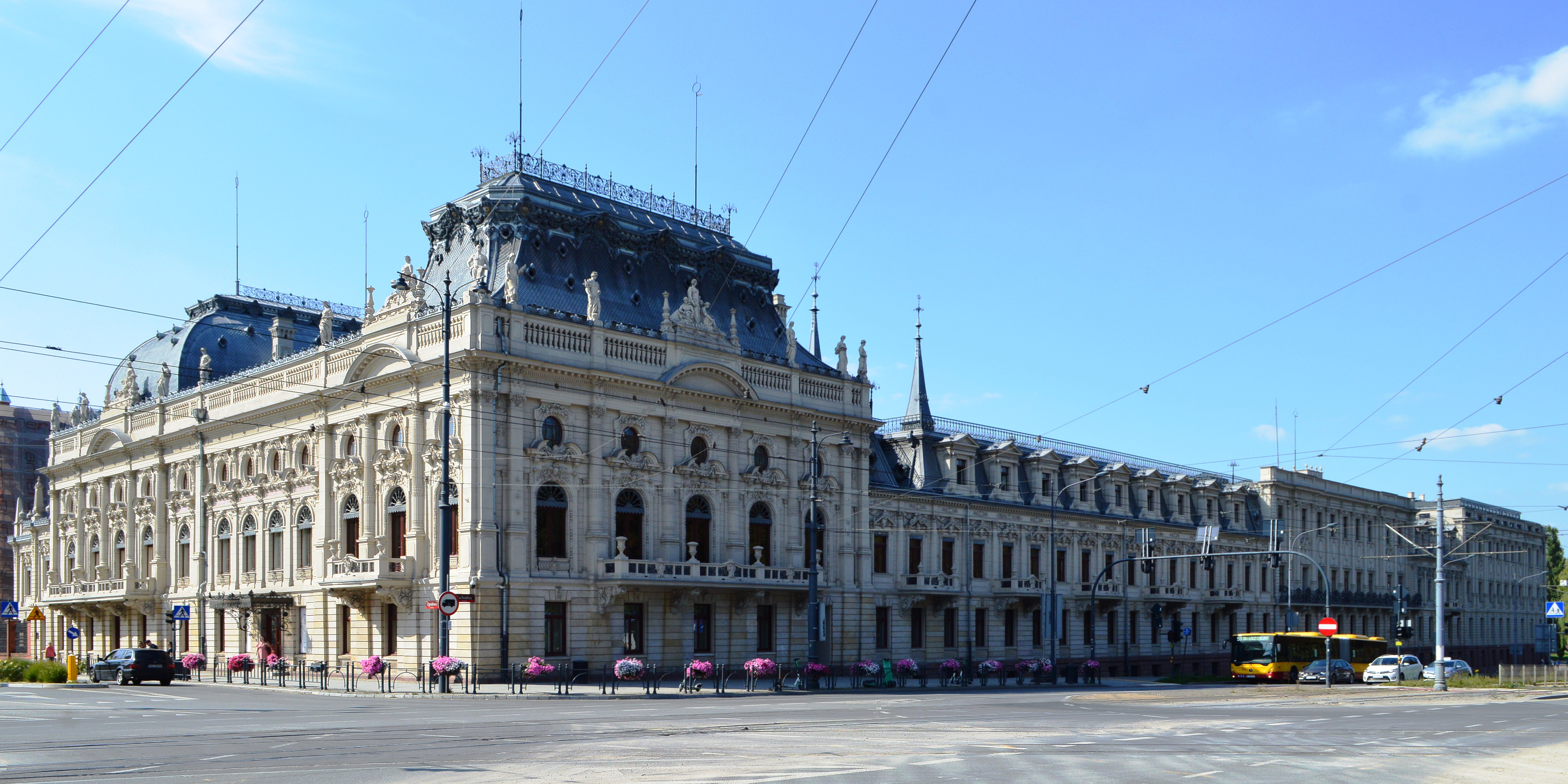
- Izrael Poznański Palace in 2023

- Location within Poland
- 51.7788°N 19.4512°E
- Location: Łódź, Poland

History
- Built: 1877 (1888-1903 modifications)

Site notes
- Architect(s): Hilary Majewski, Adolf Zeligson
- Architectural style: Eclecticism
- Governing body: Łódź Municipal Office

The Izrael Poznański Palace (Polish: Pałac Izraela Poznańskiego) is a 19th-century palace in Łódź, Poland. Initially the site of a tenement building, the property was transformed into a Neo-Renaissance and Neo-baroque style residence during the years 1888 to 1903. It currently houses the Museum of the City of Łódź.

== History ==
The history of the palace goes back to the 1860s. It was during this time that Kalman Poznański, a Polish-Jewish trader from Kowal in the Kuyavia region, arrived and began to live in Łódź. Kalman started a cotton industry, but it was not successful. However, when the business was taken over by his son, Izrael (1833–1900), there was a phenomenal rise in the price of cotton around the world. Izrael made a fortune from cotton and spent a large part of his earnings on the palace, which eventually took on his name.

When Izrael Poznański acquired the site of the palace, there was a modest two-story building standing already. He renovated and expanded the building into a large residence. Taking his inspiration from the French neo-Renaissance, architect Hilary Majewski (and later Adolf Zeligson who modified the building) designed a suitably lavish abode which was meant to be the residence of Poznański, one of the key industrialists that drove the textile revolution in Łódź. The palace was marked for its opulence and grand size, and distinguished itself from the surrounding residences.

The palace is also notable because of its L-shaped design. Another feature of the palace is the southern wing, which is topped with the tall domed roofs. It also included gardens filled with "botanical phenomena" so rare to the country that their Latin names had no Polish equivalent at the time, a shooting range and exteriors boasting majestic domes, fancy embellishments and sculptures representing allegories of industry. Inside, a ballroom, a chamber of mirrors and a glass-ceilinged winter garden were also added to the labyrinthine layout. The interior decoration of the large Dining Room as well as the Ballroom was designed by a renowned Łódź artist and painter Samuel Hirszenberg.

Before the outbreak of World War II, members of the Poznański family emigrated to Western Europe. During the German occupation, the palace served as headquarters of Nazi German authorities. After the war, the building served as the seat of the voivodeship office.

Since 1975, the palace has housed the Museum of the City of Łódź (Muzeum Miasta Łodzi). The museum possesses rich collections of numismatics, iconography, painting, sculpture, graphics, books and manuscripts. The palace served as a setting to a number of films, most notably Andrzej Wajda's 1975 Academy Award-nominated drama film The Promised Land.

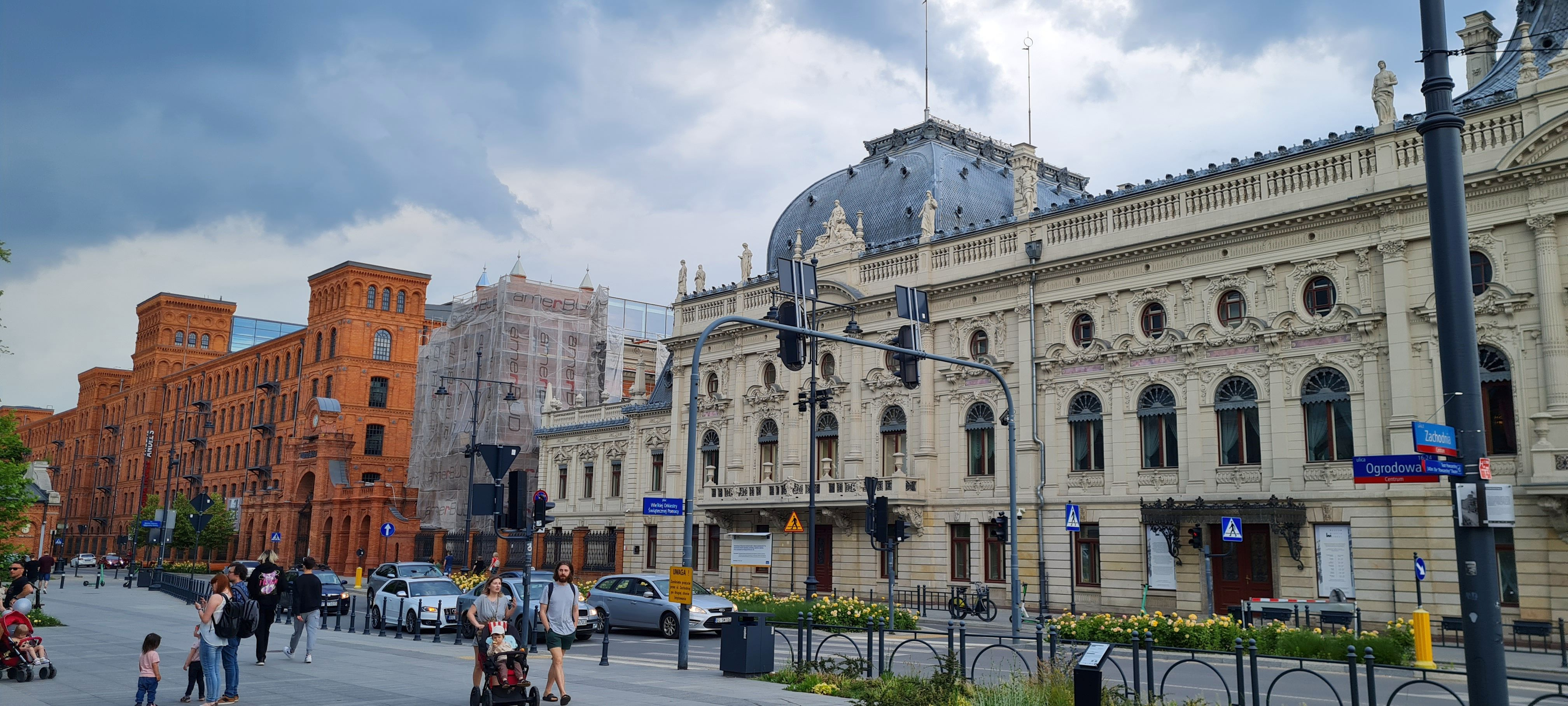
Izrael Poznański Palace (right) next to Andel's Hotel (left).

== Modern times ==
In 2015, the palace was officially included on the List of Historic Monuments of Poland. In 2017, the process of revitalization of the palace was initiated, and work began on renovating the palace's facade. Renovation of the palace was completed in 2020 on the 200th anniversary of "Modern Łódź" and the building "(has) regained its perch as one of the nation’s most magnificent urban structures."

== Gallery ==
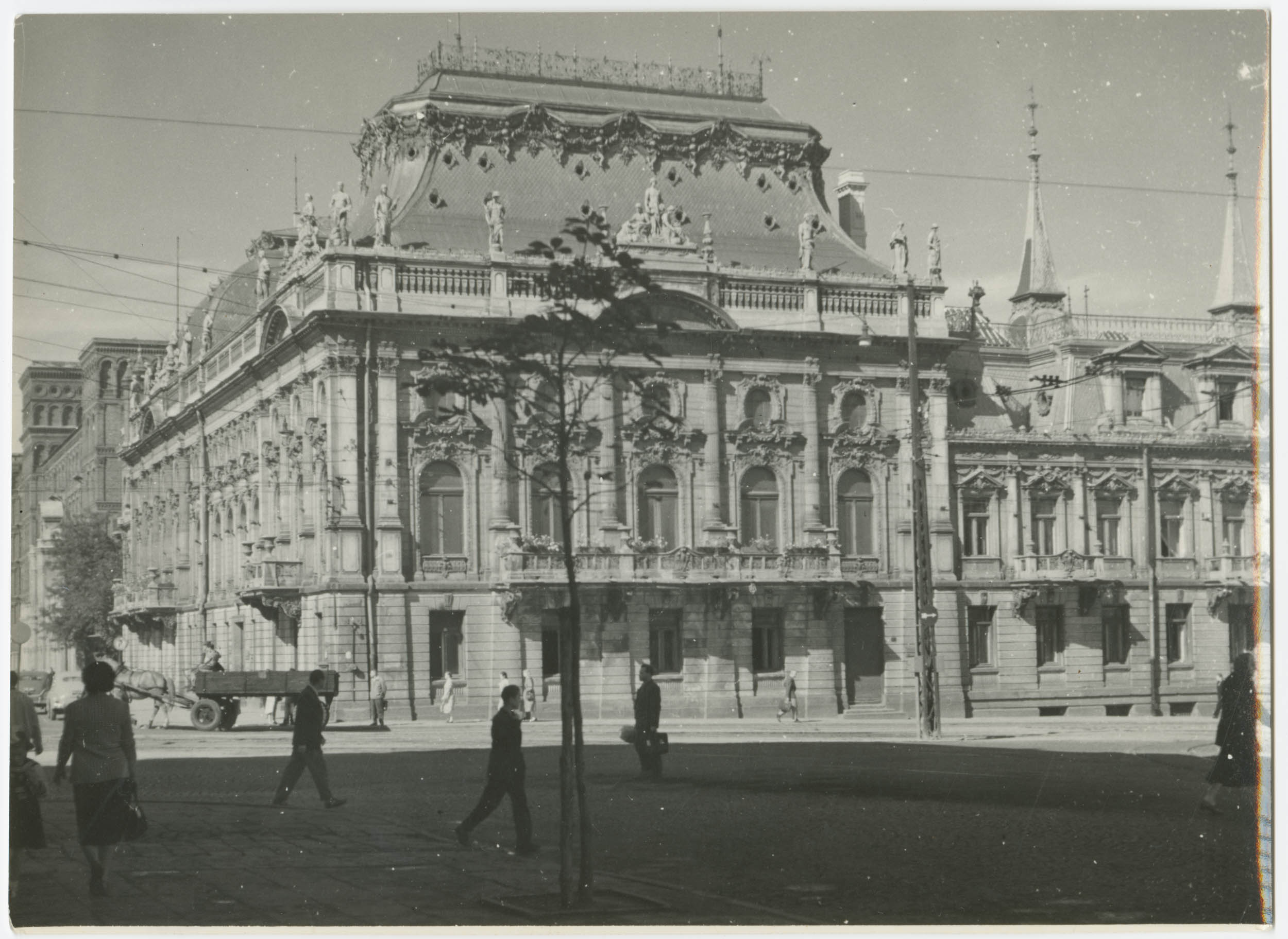
Izrael Poznański Palace in the 1950s

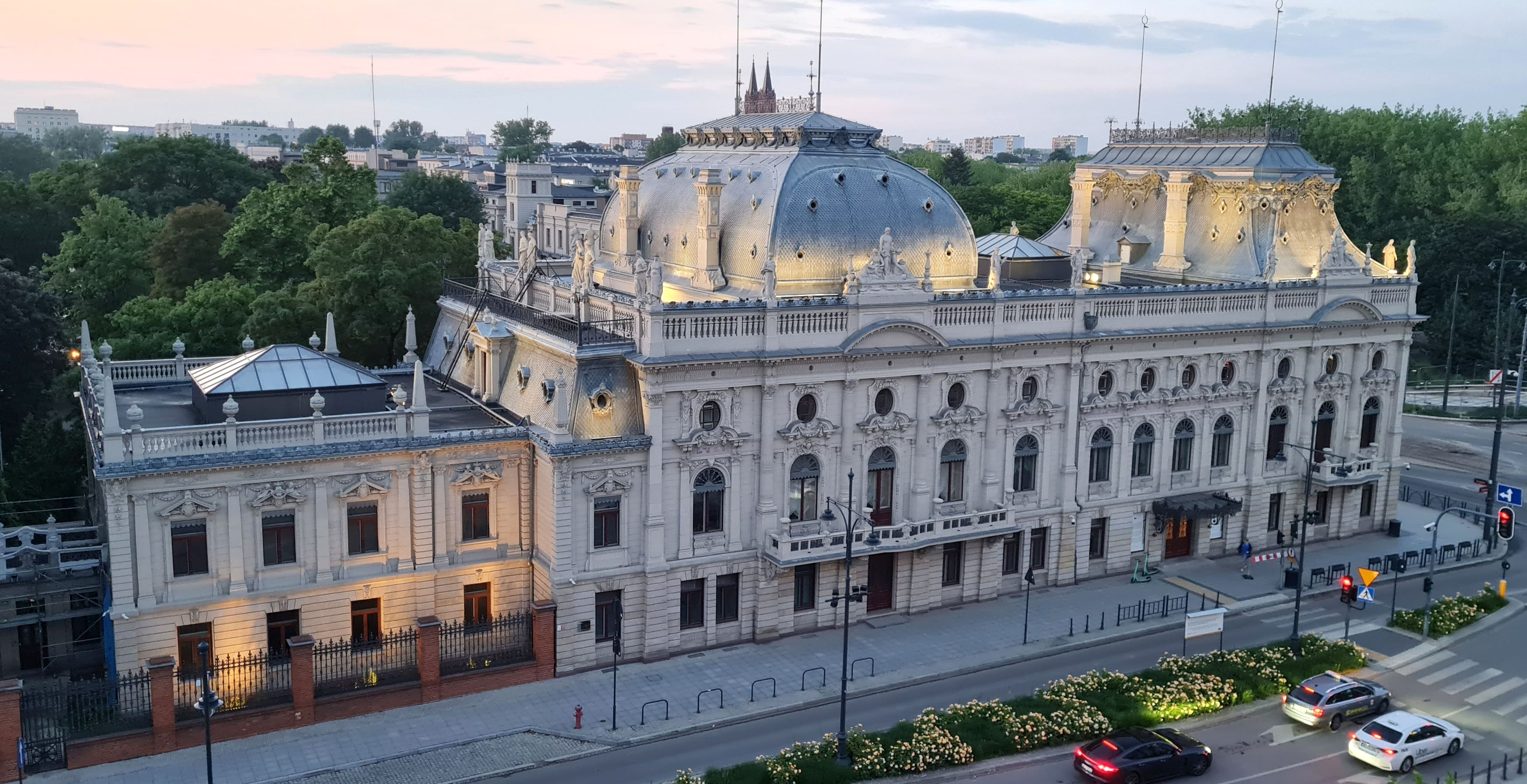
Aerial view

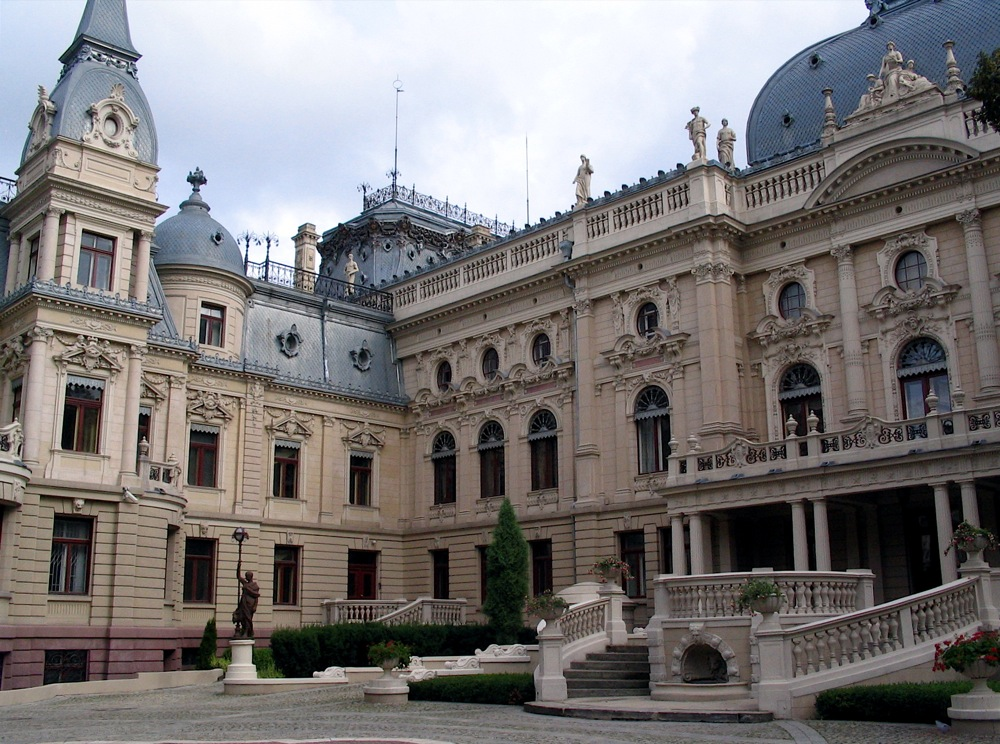
View from the palace gardens

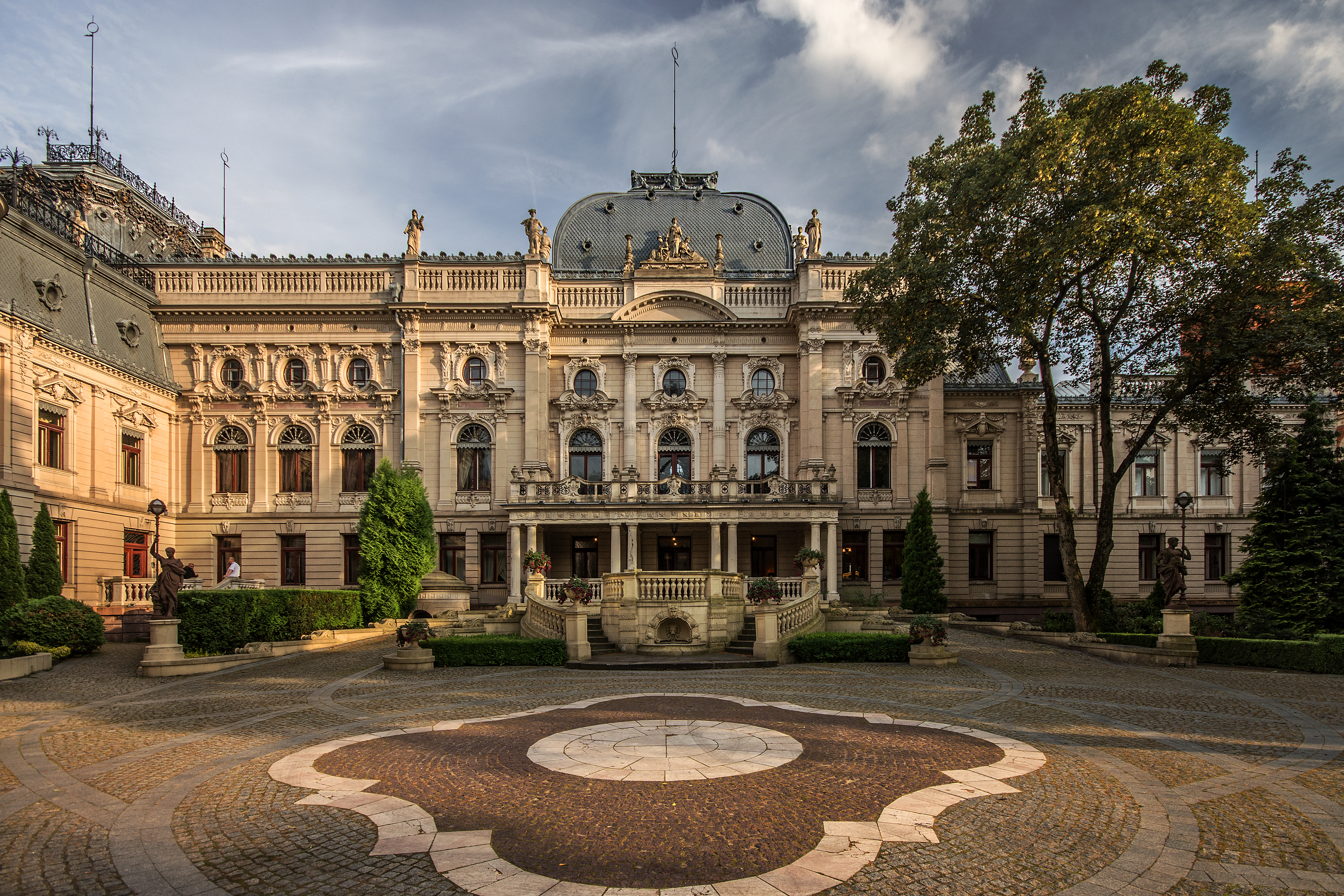
Entrance from the palace gardens

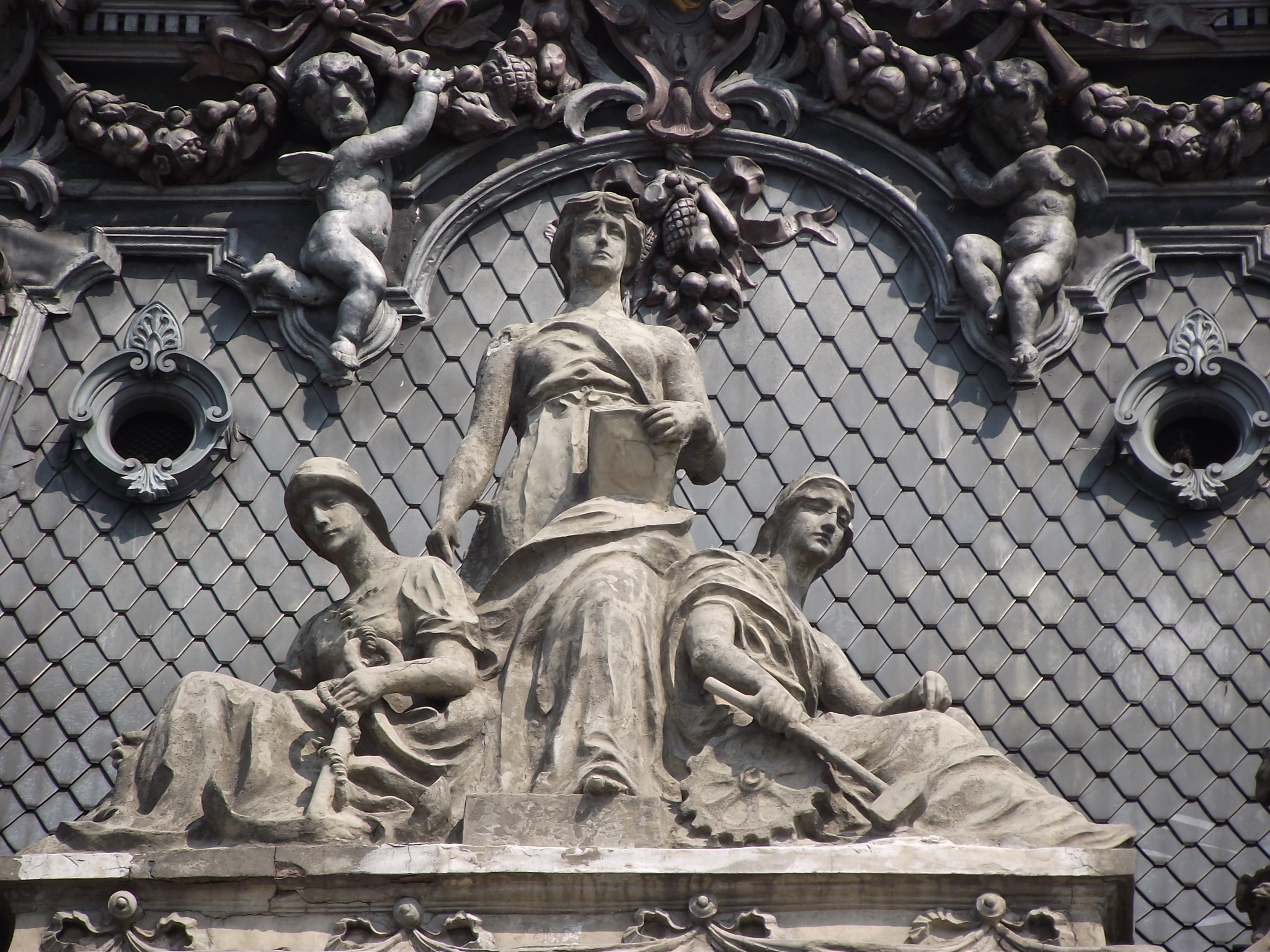
Decoration detail

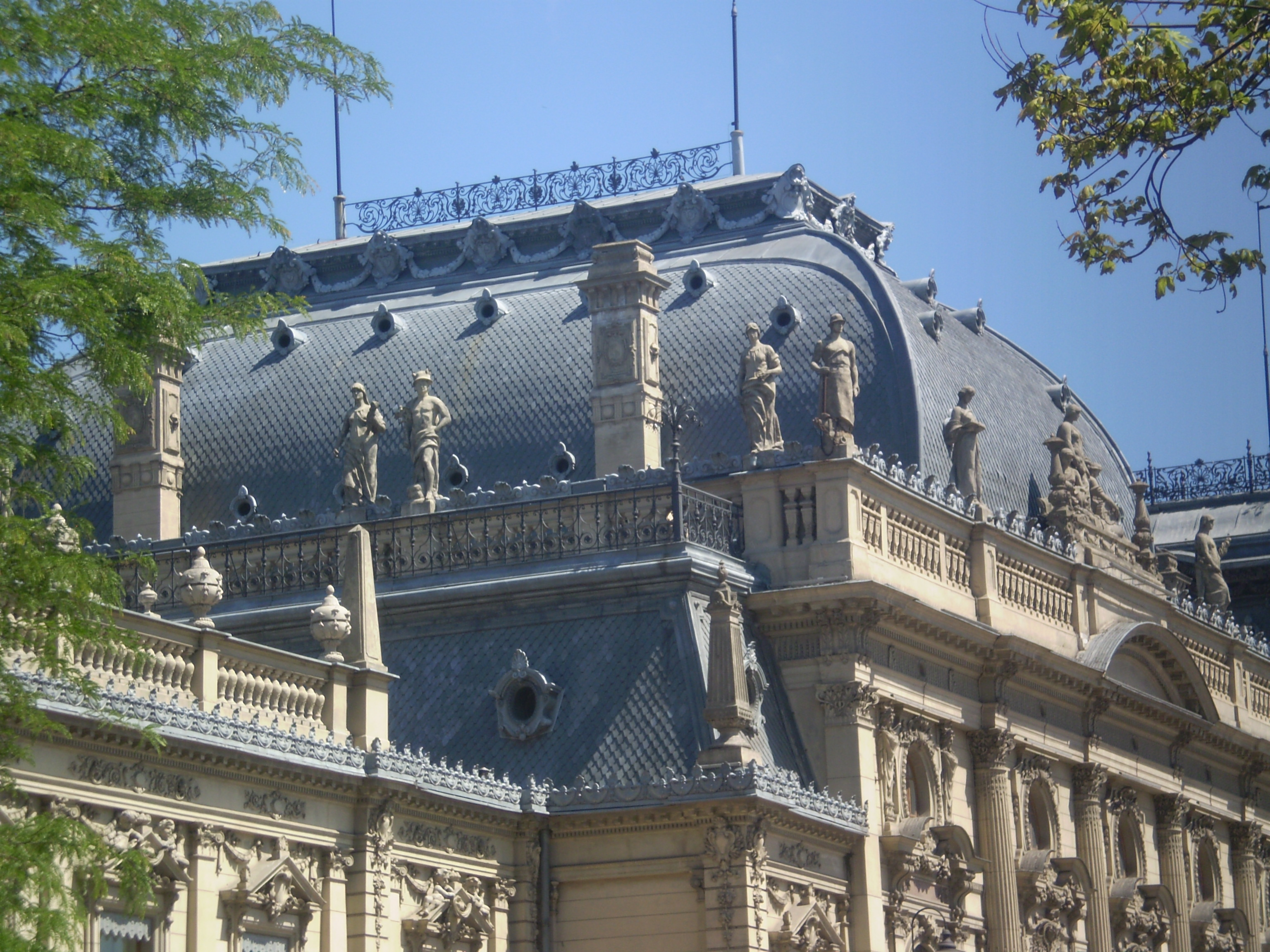
Elaborately decorated roof

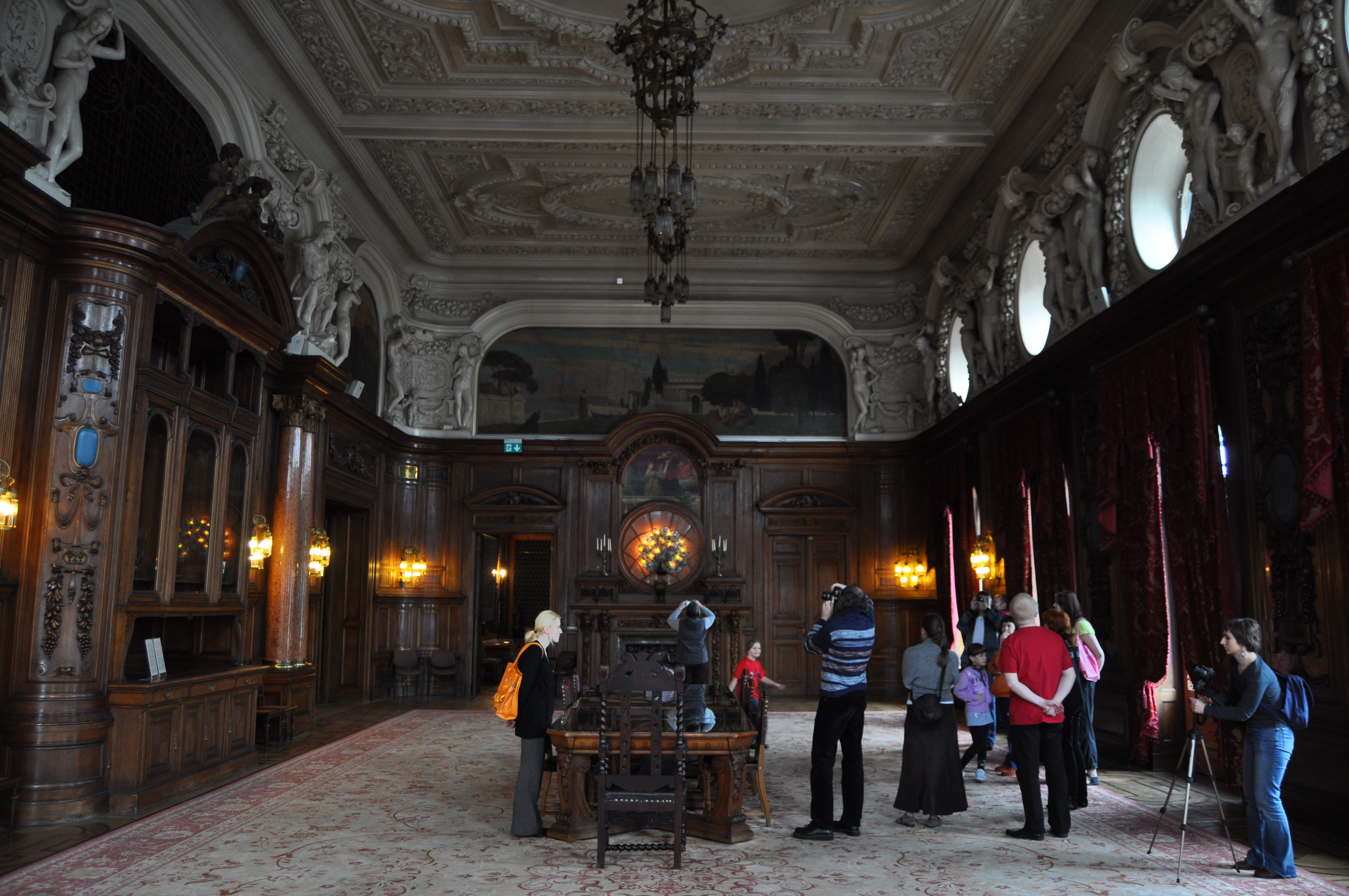
Interior

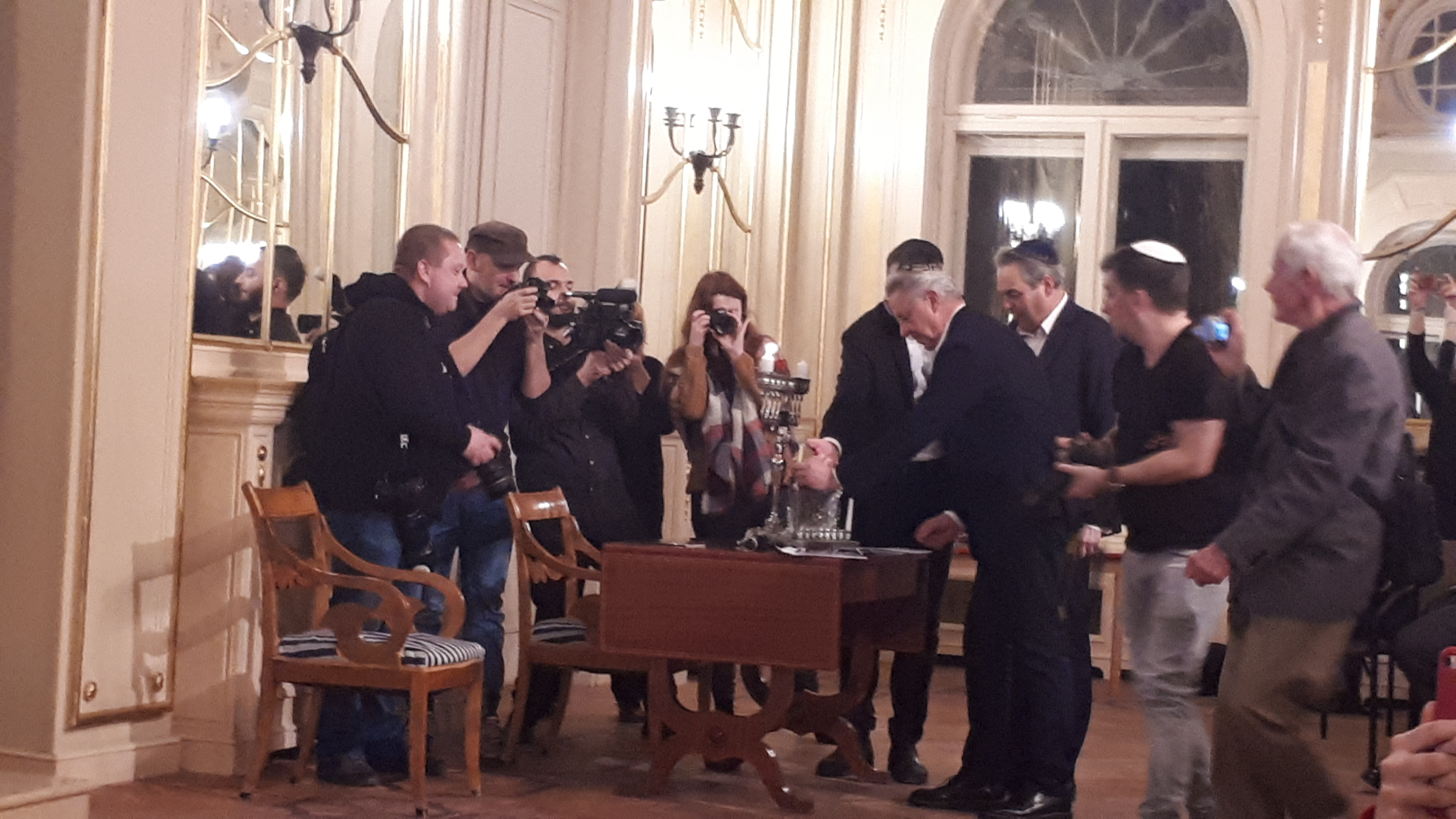
Hanukkah candles-lighting ceremony in Izrael Poznański Palace by Rabbi Dawid Szychowski

== See also ==
- List of palaces in Poland
- Karol Poznański Palace
- Manufaktura
- History of Łódź
- Juliusz Heinzl Palace
