= Andel's Hotel Łódź =

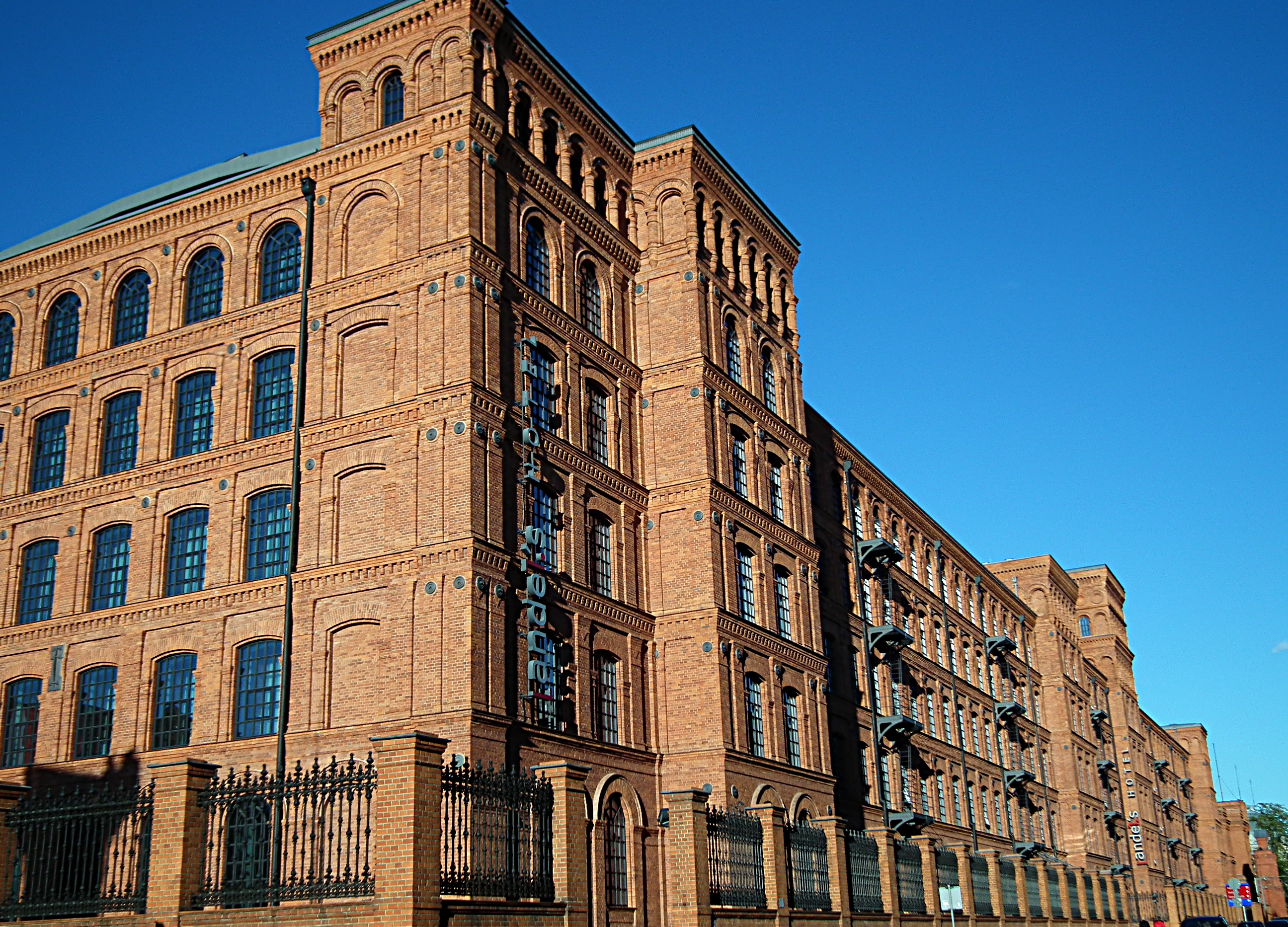
- Andel's Hotel Łódź, 2012
- Interactive map of the Andel's Hotel Łódź area

General information
- Type: hotel
- Architectural style: Industrial
- Location: 17 Ogrodowa Street, Łódź, Poland
- Coordinates: 51.7786°N 19.4484°E
- Construction started: 1872
- Completed: 1892
- Opened: 2009
- Affiliation: andel's

Design and construction
- Architect: Hilary Majewski

Other information
- Number of rooms: 278

Website
- www.viennahouse.com/pl/andels-lodz/hotel/w-skrocie.html

Andel's Hotel Łódź is a historic four-star hotel located in Łódź, Poland at 17 Ogrodowa Street in a former textile factory constructed between 1872–1892 and designed by Hilary Majewski.

== History ==
The hotel was officially opened in May 2009 and is located in the building of Izrael Poznański's former textile factory, which had been refurbished and adapted to serve as a hotel. The building is part of a large arts centre, shopping mall, and leisure complex known as Manufaktura. The hotel's project was created by the international brand andel's, which also operates in such cities as Berlin, Prague and Kraków.

The hotel offers 278 rooms including a presidential apartment as well as seven conference halls. The interior design was created by the London-based architectural firm Jestico + Whiles. In 2009, the hotel received a European Hotel Design Award in the "Architecture of the Year — Conversion of an Existing Building to Hotel Use" category. In 2010, the hotel was awarded the Special Guest of Honour Award at the MIPIM International Property Exhibition in Cannes. In 2015, it was listed as a Historic Monument by the decree of President Bronisław Komorowski as part of "the multicultural landscape of the industrial city of Łódź".

== See also ==
- List of hotels in Poland
- History of Łódź
