= Juliusz Heinzl Palace =

Historic property in Łódź, Poland

Pałac Juliusza Heinzla
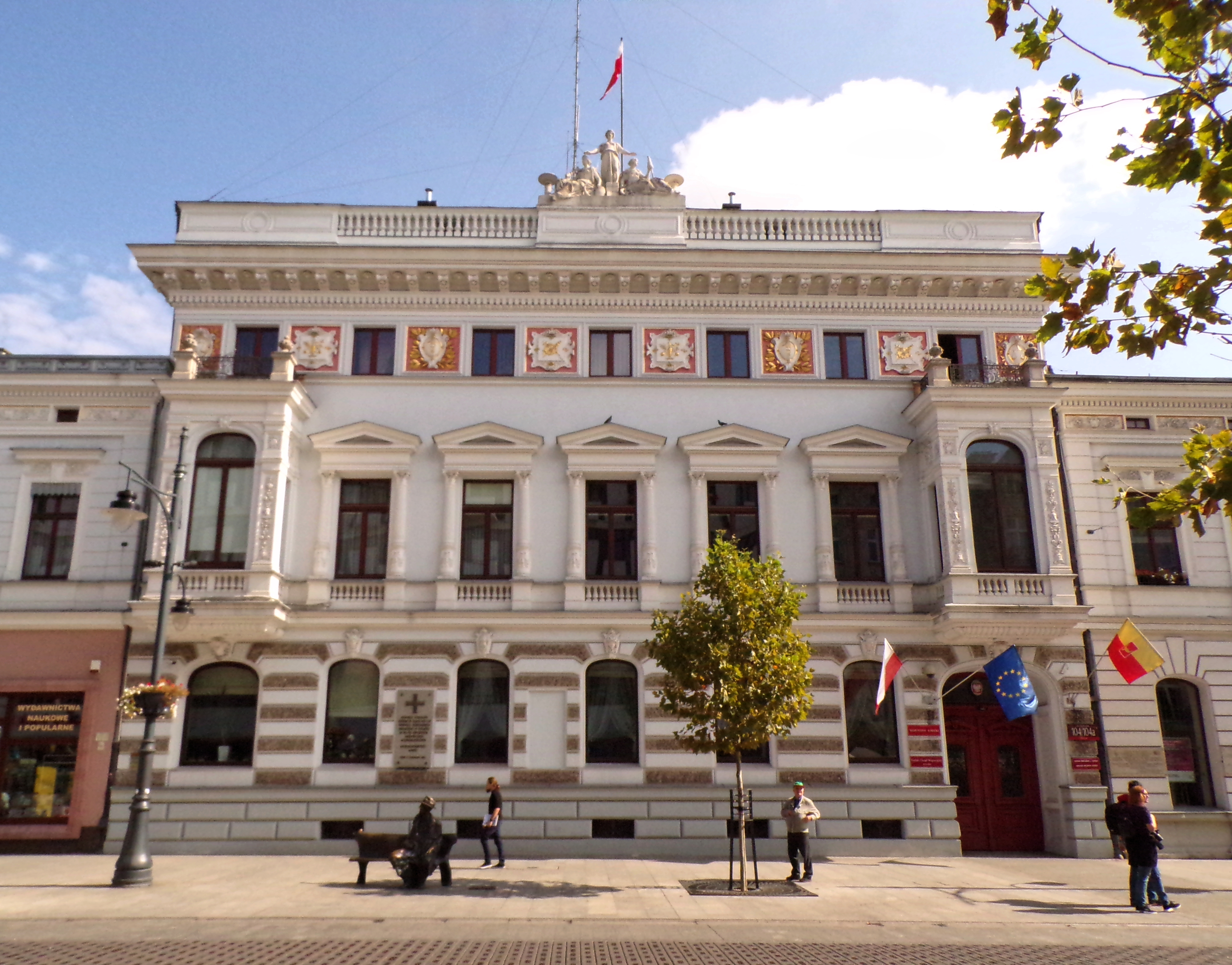
- Juliusz Heinzl Palace
- Location: Łódź, Poland
- Coordinates: 51°45′53″N 19°27′28″E
- Built: 1882
- Architect: Hilary Majewski
- Architectural style(s): Eclecticism
- Governing body: Łódź Municipal Office

Juliusz Heinzl Palace (Polish pronunciation: [juliuʂ xɛinzl]), is a palatial mansion at 104 Piotrkowska Street in Łódź, Poland. Named after its initial owner, it currently houses the Łódź City Hall.

== History ==
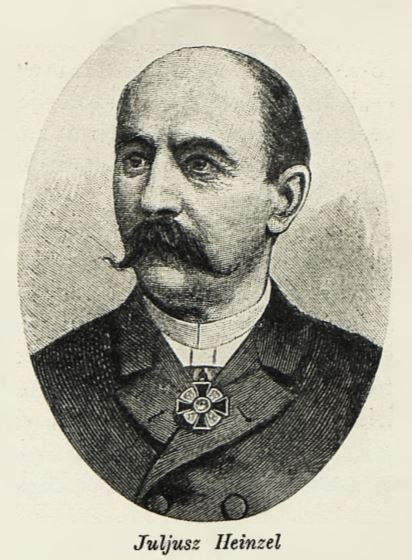
Juliusz Heinzel, baron von Hohenfels (1834-1895)

It is the first of the three residences of Heinzel (also spelled Heinzl), its construction was completed in 1882 by Hilary Majewski and Otto Gehlig. The palace was situated next to a wool products factory, in the street's regulatory line, right in front of the factory buildings, extending deep into the property. It was built in eclectic style with predominance of elements referring to the Berlin Renaissance. The palace consisted of a three-storey main body and lower side wings, and two pavilions ended with towers, separated from the palace by a decorative grating. Over the years, it has undergone modifications and reconstructions.

The first floor of the front facade of the main body is decorated with symmetrically placed bay windows on the sides, decorated with a baluster railing. Below the cordon cornice there is a frieze with cartouche-shaped panels and emblems of industry and trade. The façade is crowned with a sculptural figural composition, depicting allegories of Freedom, Industry, and Trade.

=== Juliusz Heinzl ===
The Heinzel family probably came to Łódź from Bohemia or Lower Silesia in the 1830s. In 1864 Heinzel established his own mechanical weaving mill for woolen goods. Within a few years (around 1874) he became the king of wool, having the largest production complex in the Kingdom of Poland producing woolen and semi-woolen products.

== Modern use ==
In the 21st century, the palace, integrated with factory buildings, was converted into offices, serves as the seat of the Provincial Office and the City of Łódź.

In 1999, a monument to Julian Tuwim by Wojciech Gryniewicz was unveiled in front of the palace. The building is entered in the register of monuments under the number A/41 (January 20, 1971).

=== Hejnał of Łódź ===
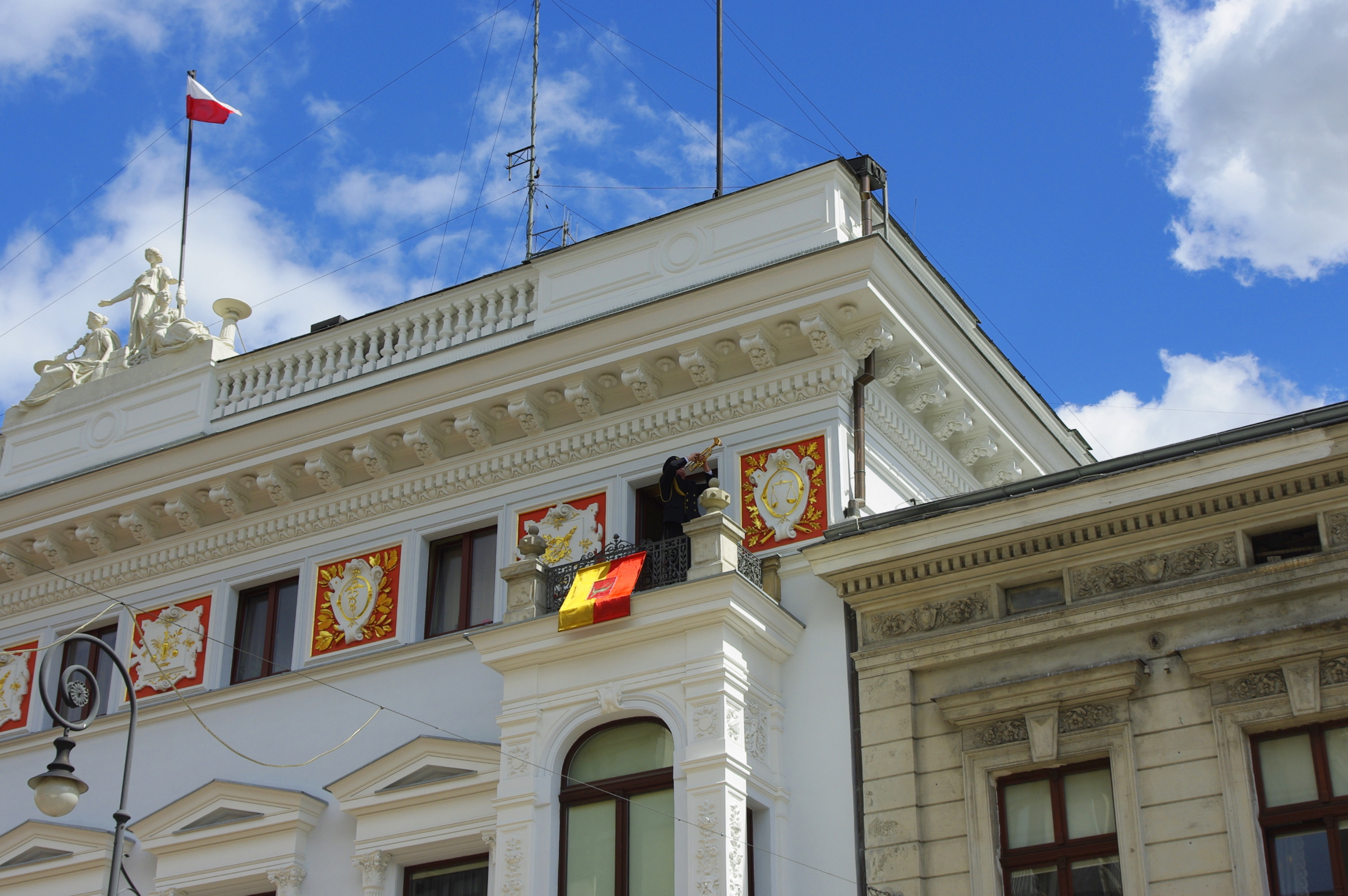
Trumpeter playing Hejnał, 13 May 2009

From July 29, 1998 (in accordance with the resolution No. LXXXVI/835/98 of the City Council), Prząśniczka became the official bugle call (hejnał) of Łódź and one of the city symbols. Prząśniczka (Polish pronunciation: [pʐɔ̃ɕnit͡ʂka]) is a song composed by Stanisław Moniuszko and written by Jan Czeczot. Currently, it is often performed as an instrumental piece on wind instruments.

The bugle call is played every day on the trumpet, at 12:00, from the window of the City Council at Piotrkowska 106 (until September 8, 2011 from the balcony of the Heinzl's palace).

== See also ==
- Izrael Poznański Palace
- History of Łódź
