= Hilary Majewski =

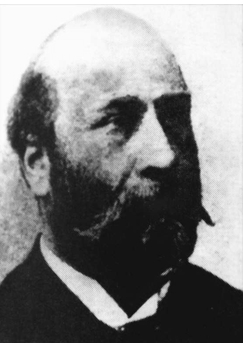
- Born: January 15, 1838; Radom, Congress Poland, Russian Empire
- Died: July 21, 1892 (aged 54); Łódź, Congress Poland, Russian Empire
- Occupation: architect
- Practice: Imperial Academy of Arts, Saint Petersburg
- Buildings: Izrael Poznański's Palace; Heinzl Palace; Grand Hotel in Łódź

Hilary Majewski (Polish pronunciation: [majɛfski], born 15 January 1838, Radom – died 21 July 1892, Łódź) was a Polish architect, a representative of the 19th-century historicism. Between 1872–1892, he served as the city architect of Łódź, Central Poland, and is regarded as one of the most prominent architects in the city's history.

== Life and career ==
He was born on 15 January 1838 in Radom to father Wincenty and mother Teofilia née Piątkowska. In the years 1859–1861 he studied at the Imperial Academy of Arts in Saint Petersburg and received his diploma in 1864. After completing his studies, he was granted a scholarship which allowed him to travel across Europe to countries like Italy, France, England and Bavaria where he acquired his aesthetic taste in architecture which he later used in his professional career as an architect.

He served as the chief architect in the Radom District and then established his own architecture studio in Warsaw. In 1872, he accepted the position of the City Architect of Łódź and fulfilled this role until his death.

Majewski was a very prolific architect and is considered the most renowned architect of the city of Łódź. He was the author of 546 projects which he signed with his name, though a few of them were created in collaboration with other architects. He designed villas, private residences, palaces, tenement houses and supervised the construction of factories, bridges and roads. He designed many townhouses along the city's longest thoroughfare, the Piotrkowska Street. He also designed his own house along the Kamienna Street 11 (currently Włókiennicza Street).

In 1889, he was awarded the Order of Saint Stanislaus (Class II) and in 1890, he received the Order of Saint Anna (Class II).

== Selected projects ==
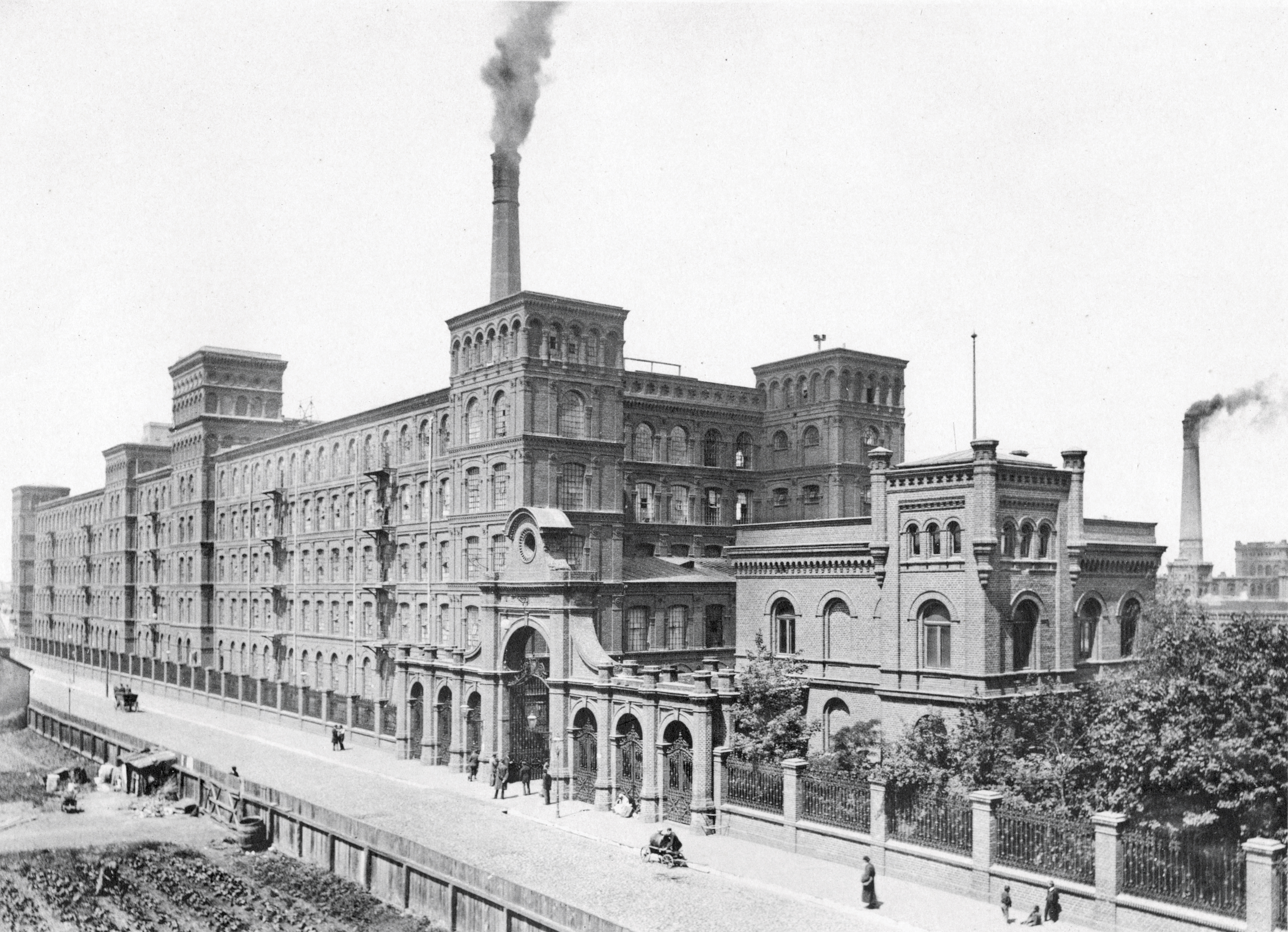
Izrael Poznański Factory, 1895

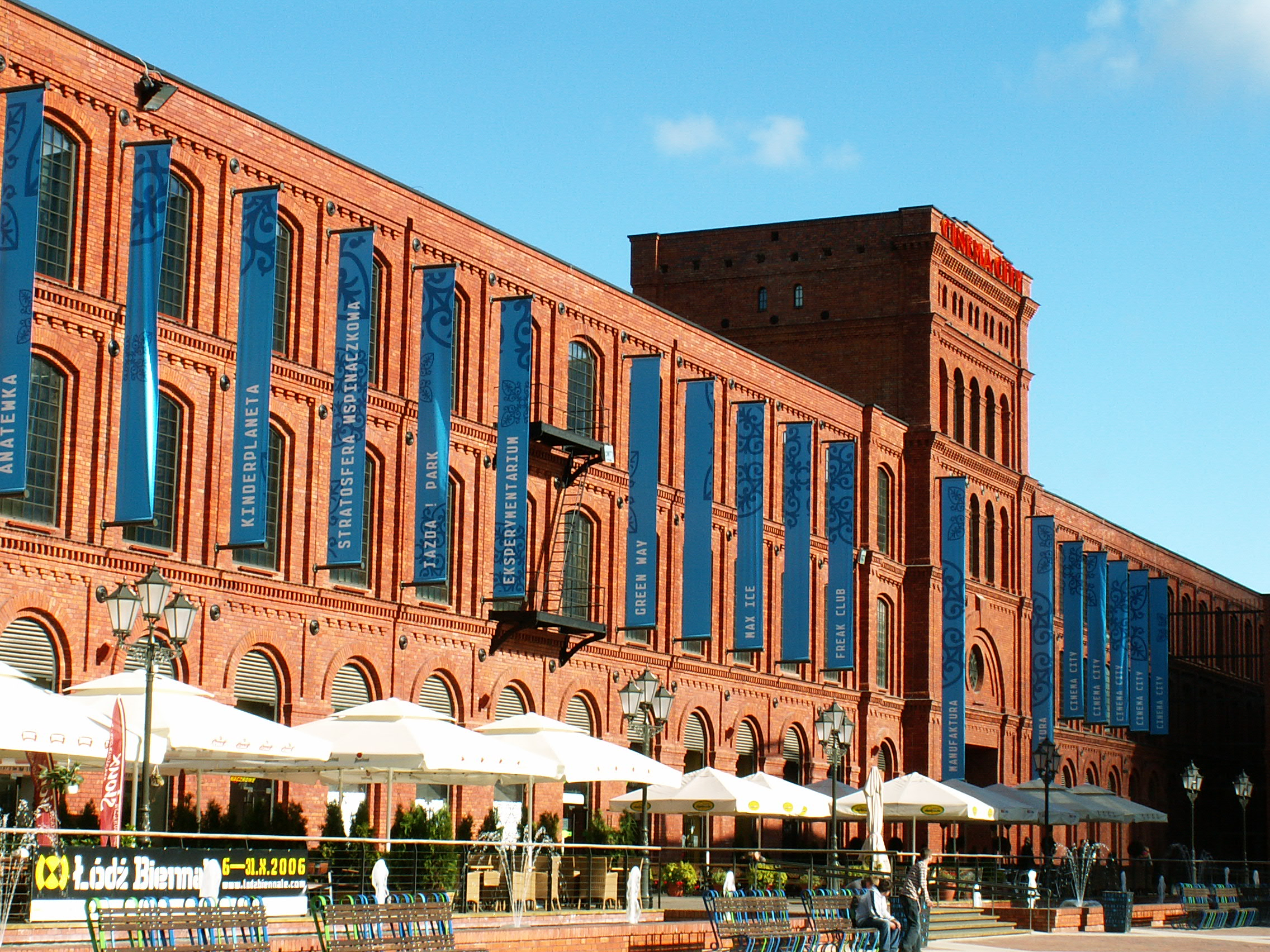
Manufaktura, 2006

- Izrael Poznański Textile Factory, currently Andel's Hotel Łódź, which is a part of Manufaktura Arts and Shopping Centre, (1872–1892)
- Grand Hotel, Piotrkowska Street 72, the building previously served as Ludwik Meyer's factory, it was re-adapted as a hotel in 1912–1913 according to a project by Majewski and Dawid Lande, (1872–1887)
- Franciszek Fischer House, Piotrowska Street 54, (1872–1876)
- Matylda and Edward Herbst Villa, Przędzialniana Street 72, (1875–1877)
- Adolf Manteufel Hotel, Zachodnia Street 45, currently Medical University of Łódź, (1979)
- City Credit Union Building (Towarzystwo Kredytowe Miejskie), Pomorska Street 21, (1878–1881)
- Ludwik Grohmann's Villa, Średnia Street 17 (currently Pomorska Street 21), (1880–1882)
- Alexander Nevsky Orthodox Church, Widzewska Street 46, (currently Jan Kiliński Street 56), (1880–1884)
- Scheiblers' Townhouse, Piotrkowska Street 11, (1882)
- Juliusz Heinzl Palace, currently the building houses the Łódź Town Hall, Piotrkowska Street 104, (1882)
- Ludwik Geyer Bank, (Dom Towarzystwa Akcyjnego Ludwika Geyera), Piotrkowska Street 74, (1882–1886)
- School Building at Nowy Rynek, currently the Archeological Museum of Łódź, Liberty Square 14, (1883–1886)
- Trianon and Mignon Villas, Stanisław Moniuszko Street, (1884–1887)
- Leonia and Izrael Poznański Hospital, Sterling Street 1/3, (1885–1890)
- Maksymilian Goldfeder Palace, co-authored with Bronisław Żochowski, Piotrkowska Street 77, (1889–1892)
- Henryk Grohmann's Villa, currently the Museum of Artistic Books in Łódź, (1889)
- Rudolf Keller Palace, Długa Street, (currently Gdańska Street 49/53), (1890)
- Fire Station, Bishop Tymieniecki Street 30, (1891)
- Arnold Stiller Villa, Stefan Jaracz Street 45, (1891–1893)
- Jakub Hertz Palace, Tadeusz Kościuszko Avenue 4, (1892–1893)
- Izrael Poznański's Palace, known as the "Louvre of Łódź", one of the most recognizable landmarks of the city, co-authored with Adolf Zeligson, it currently houses the Museum of the City of Łódź, Ogrodowa Street 15, (1898)

== Gallery ==
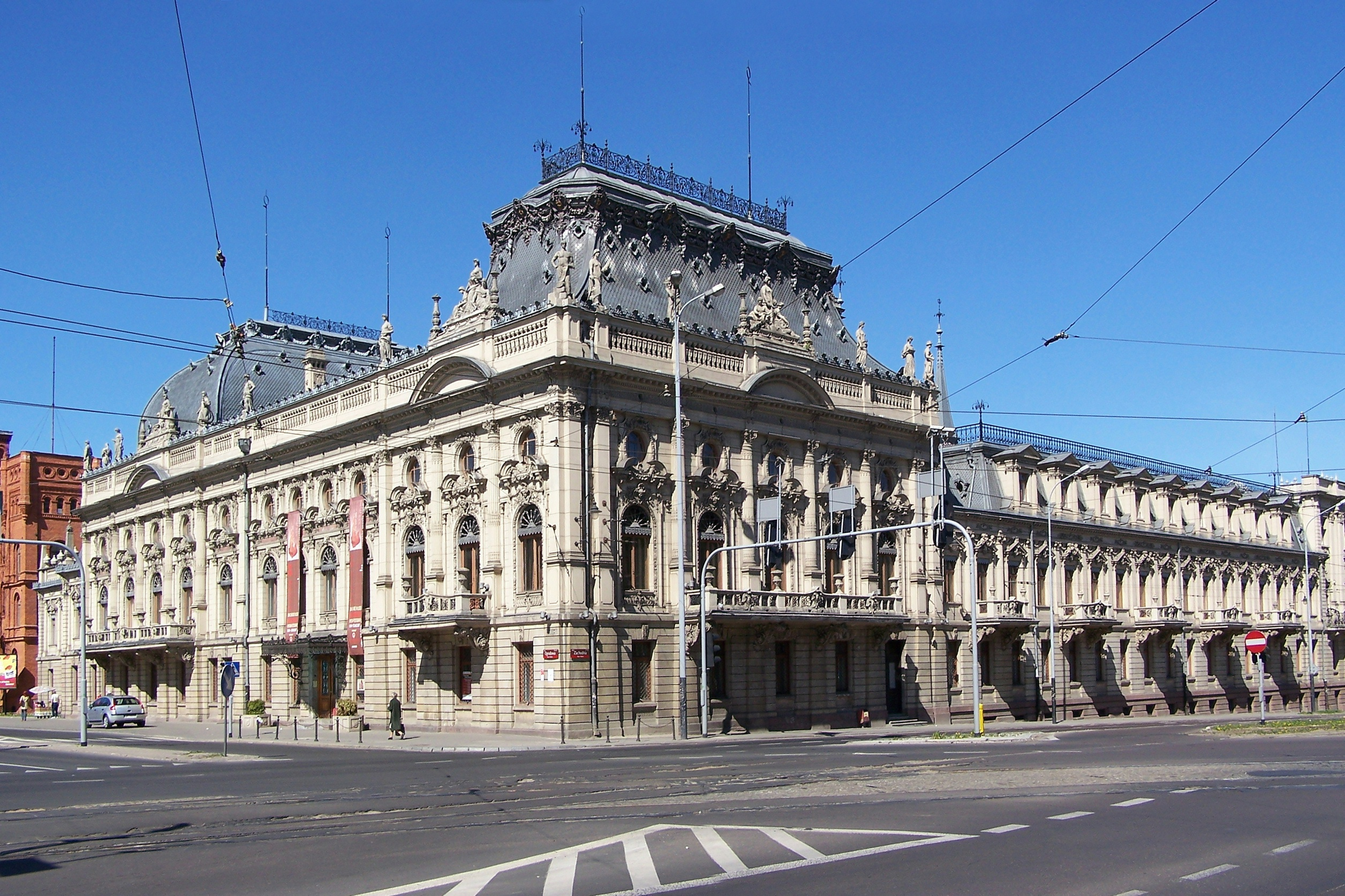
Izrael Poznański's Palace, Łódź

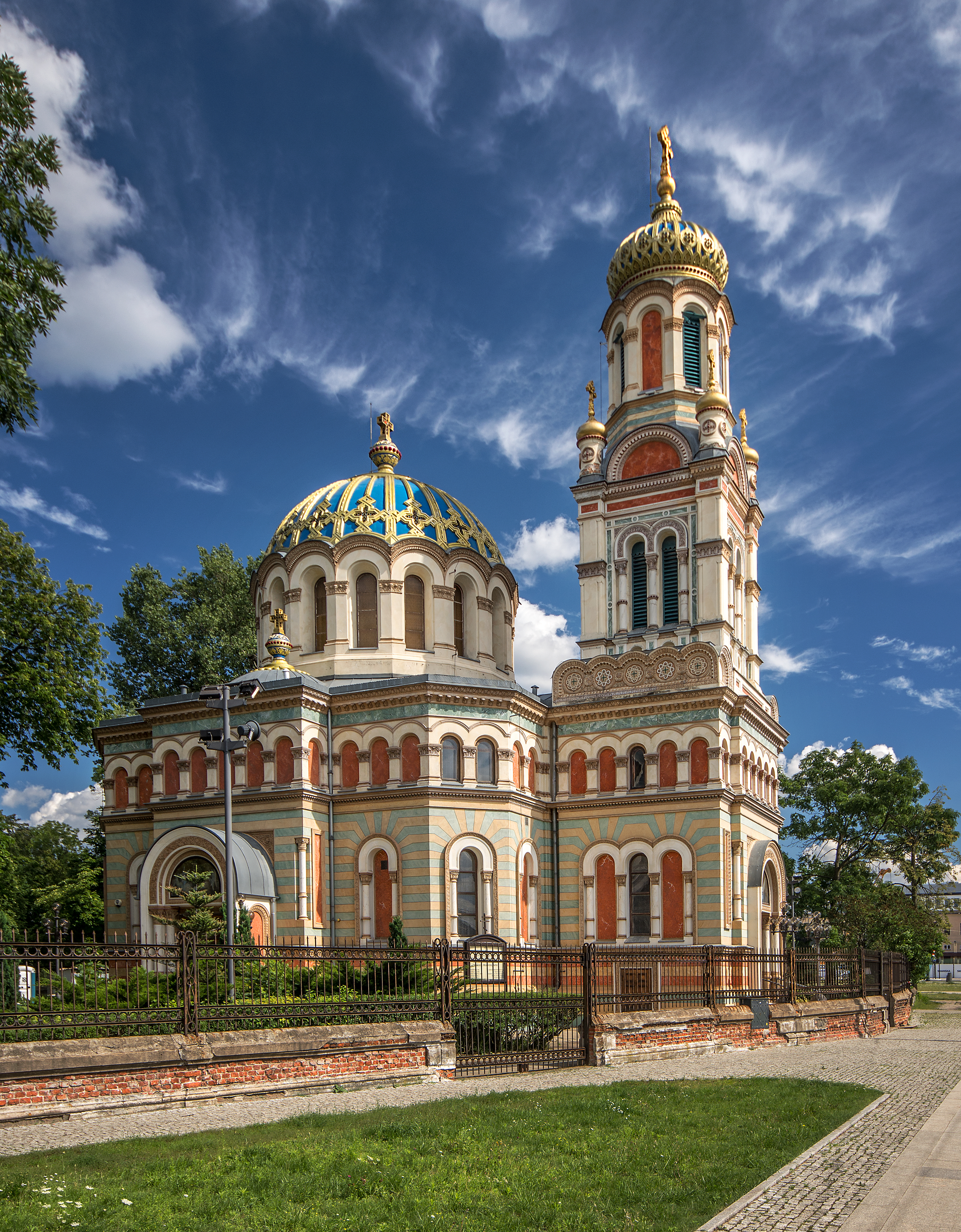
Alexander Nevsky Orthodox Church, Łódź

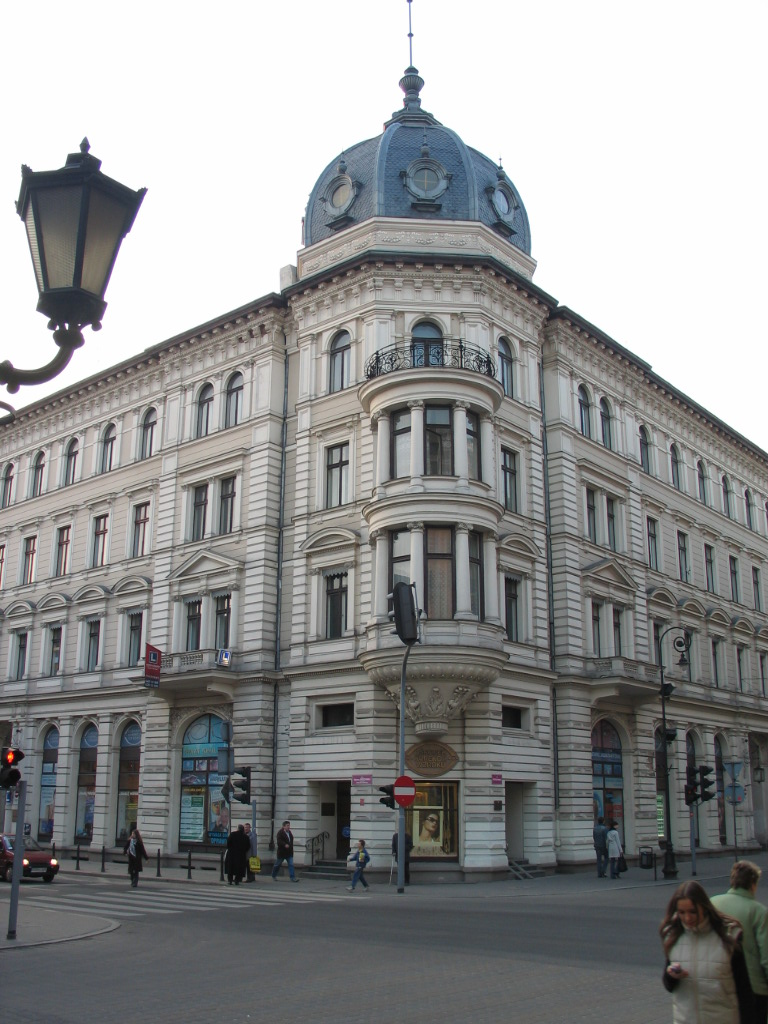
Scheiblers' Townhouse, Łódź

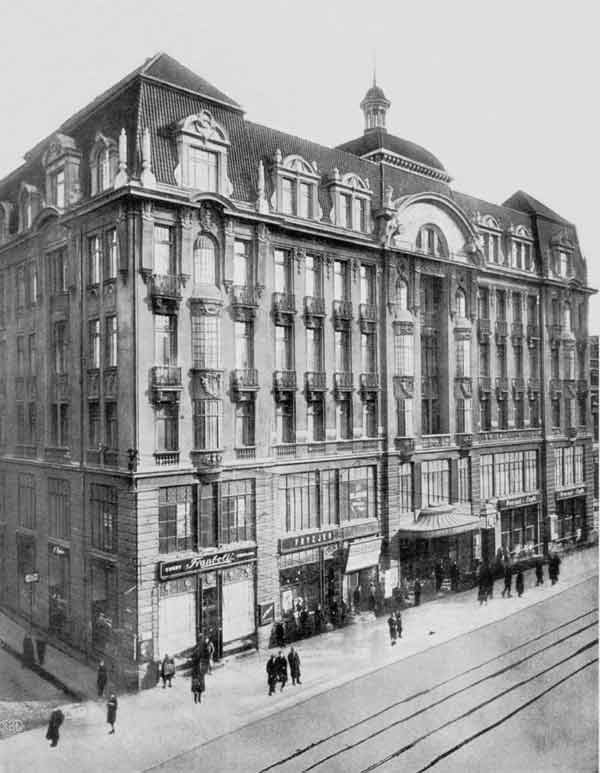
Grand Hotel in the interwar period, Łódź

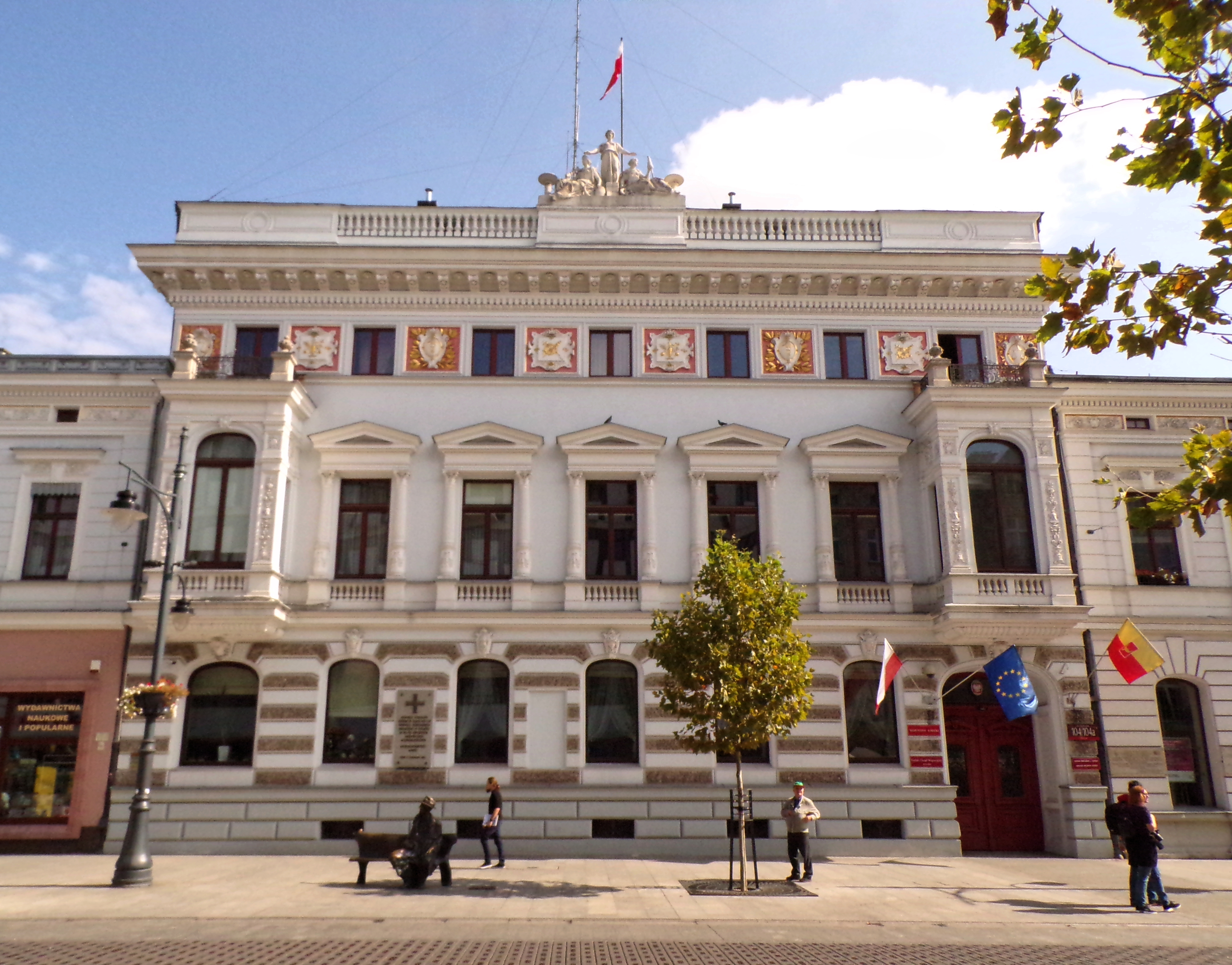
Town Hall, Łódź

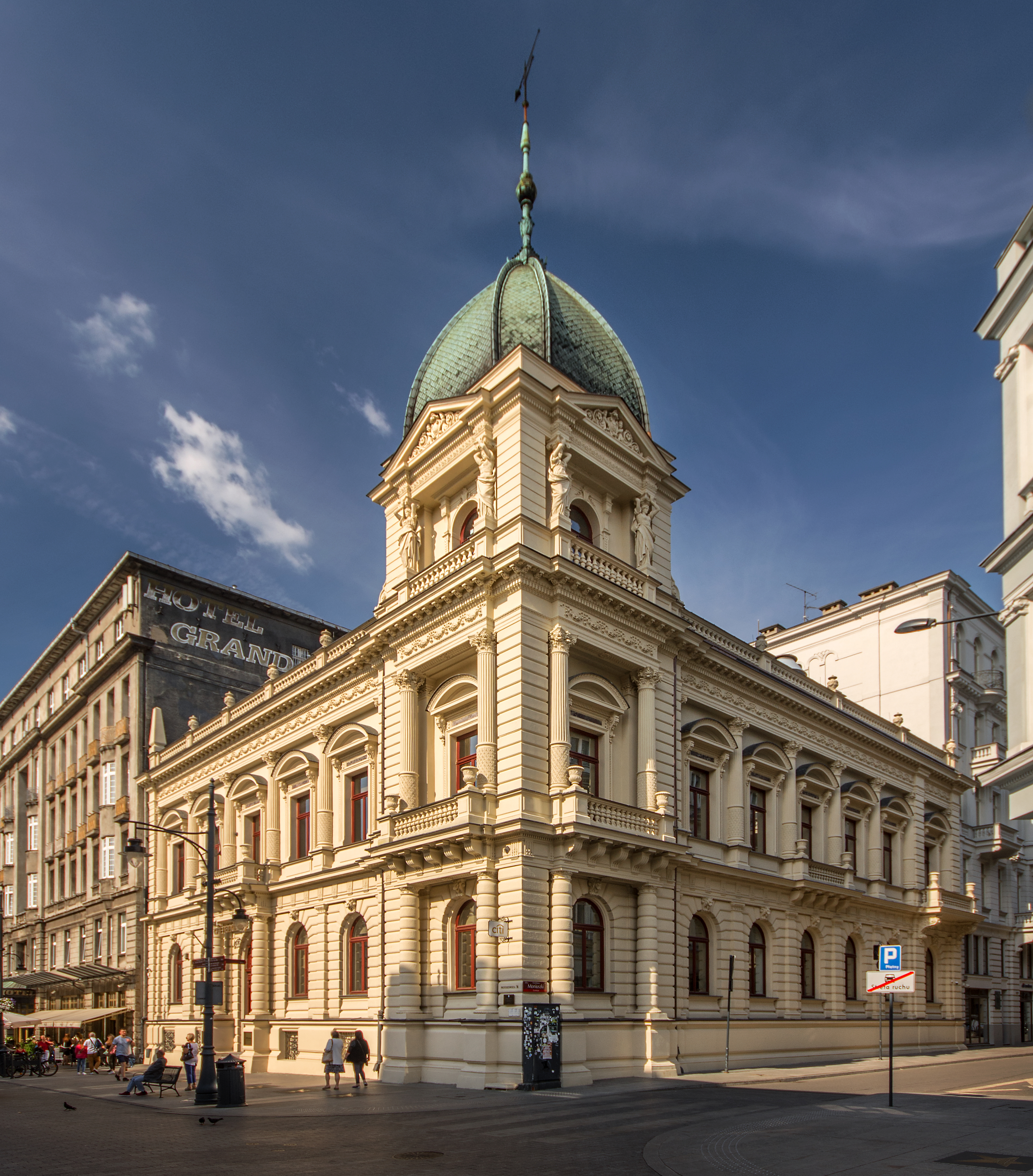
Ludwik Geyer Bank, Łódź

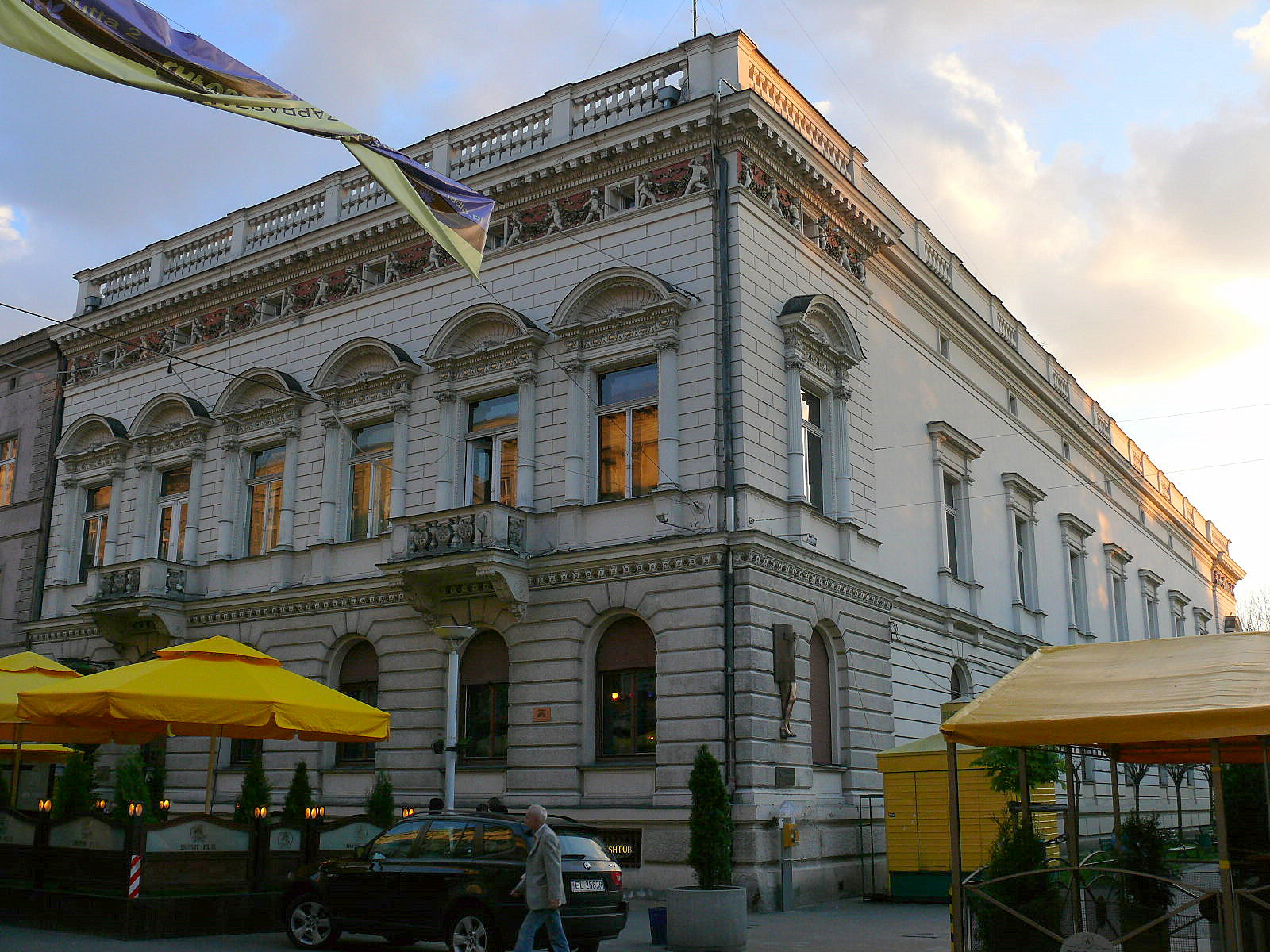
Maksymilian Goldfeder Palace, Łódź

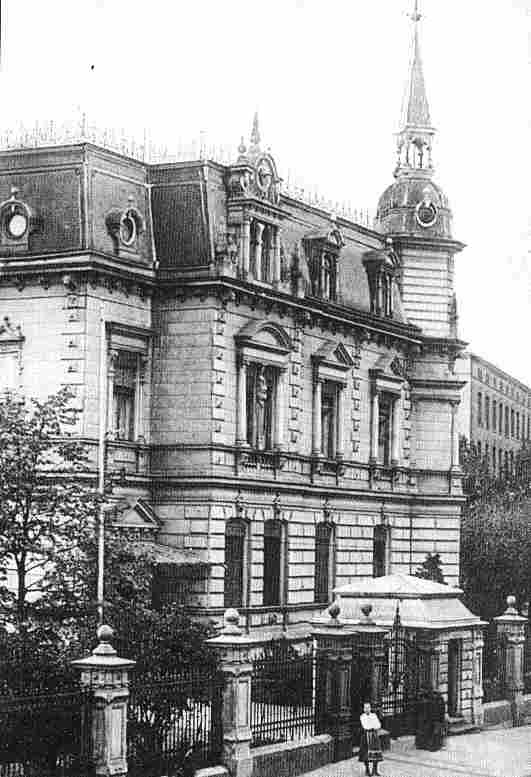
Rudolf Keller Palace, Łódź

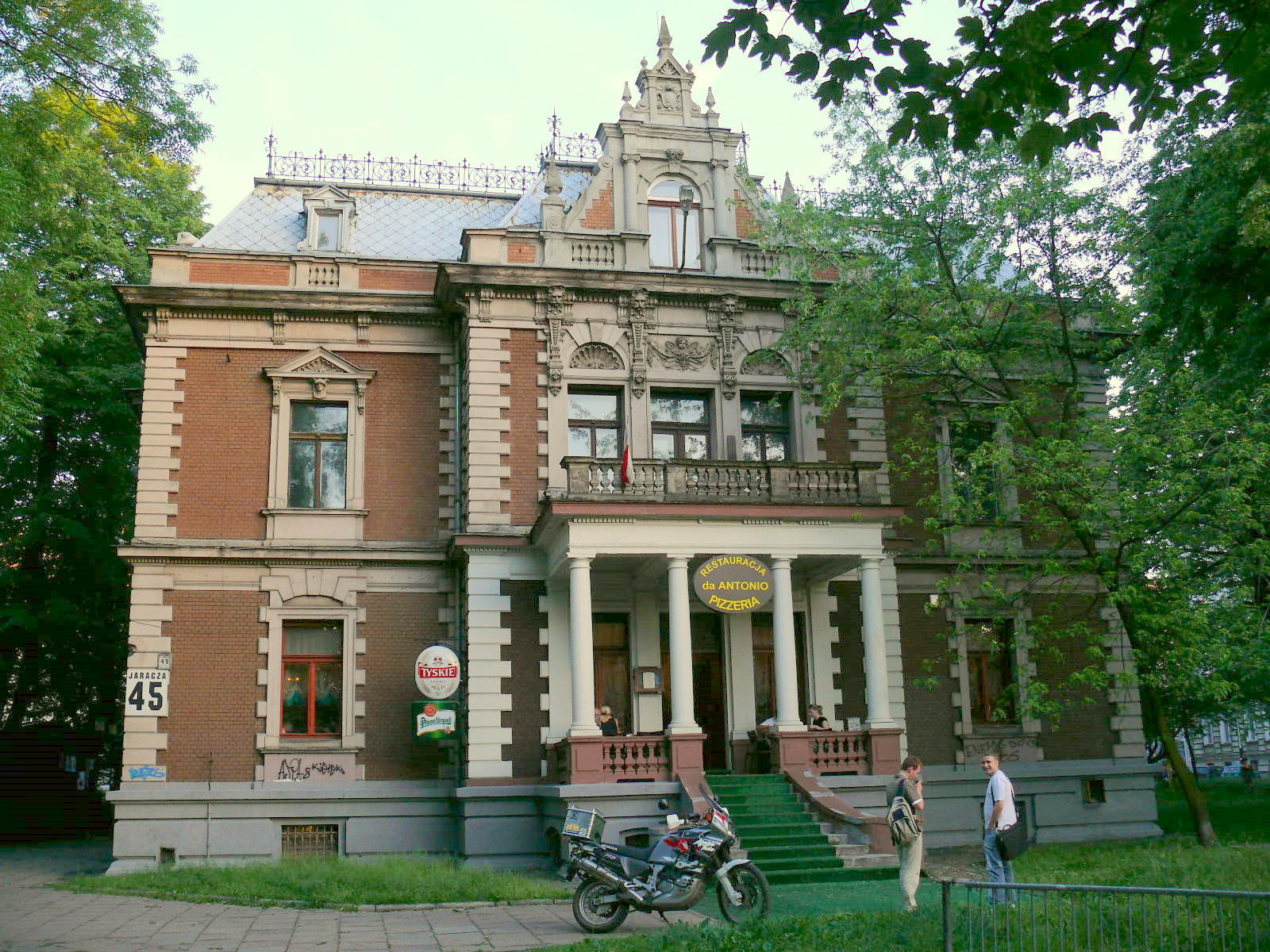
Arnold Stiller Villa, Łódź

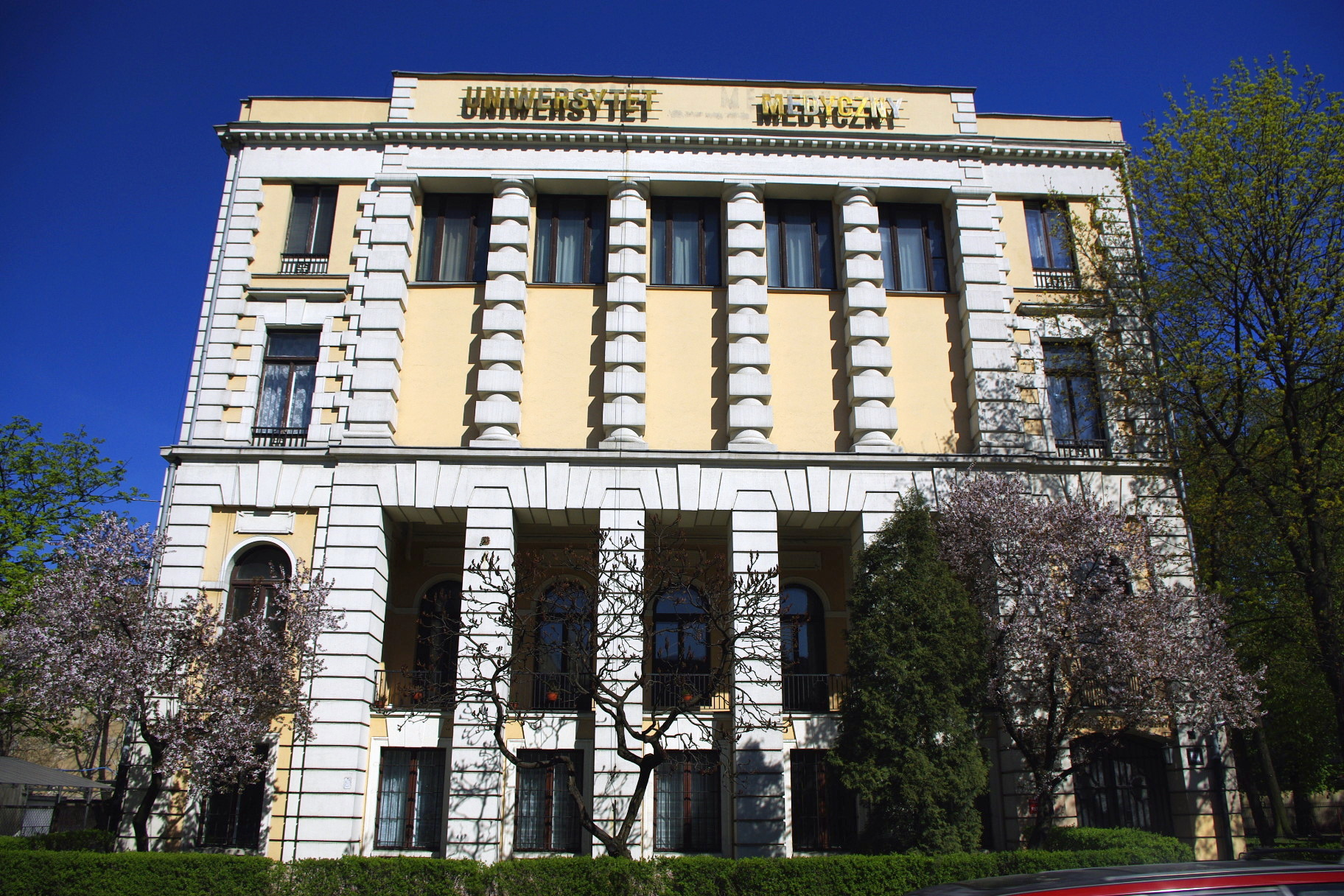
Jakub Hertz Palace, Łódź

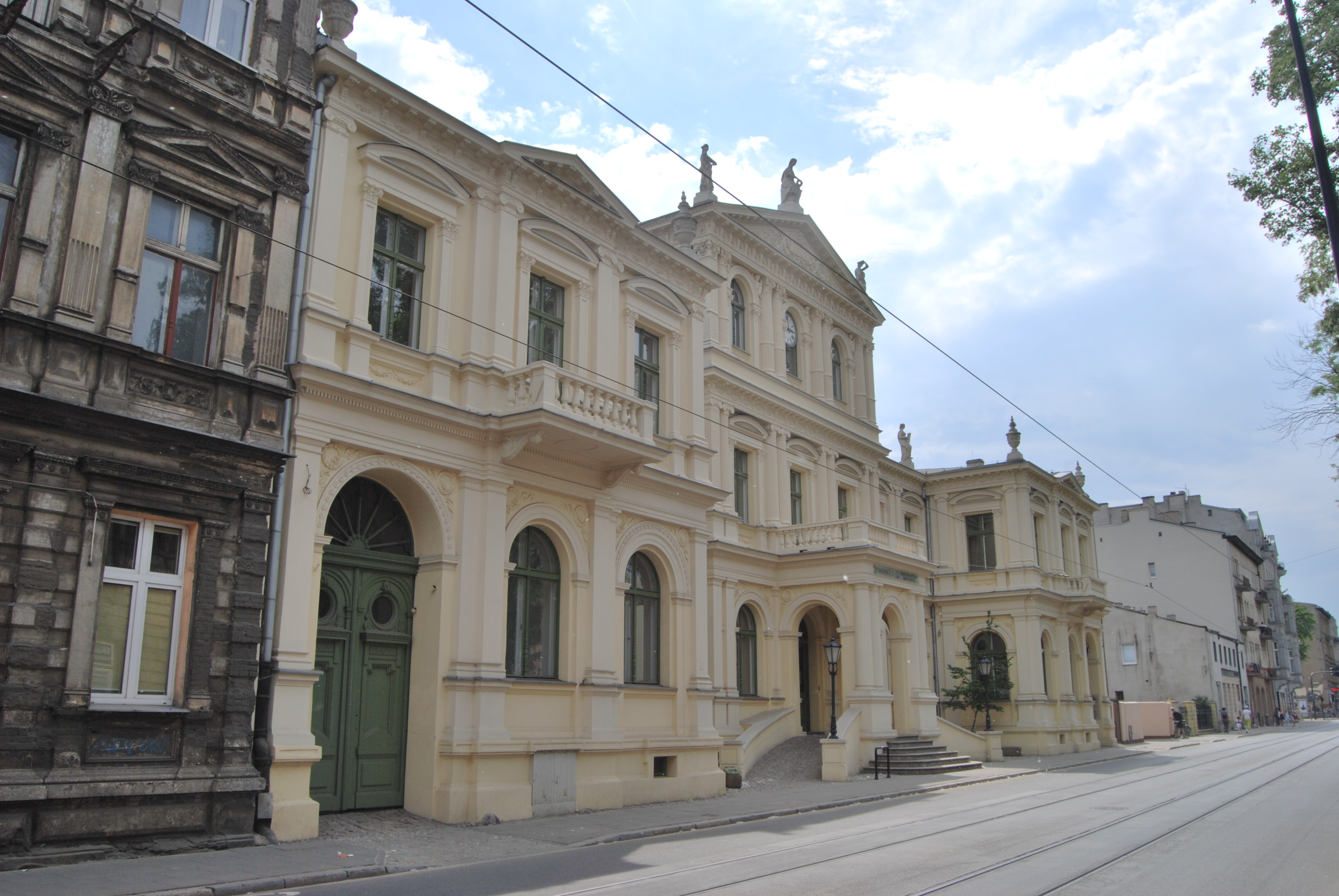
TKM Building, Łódź

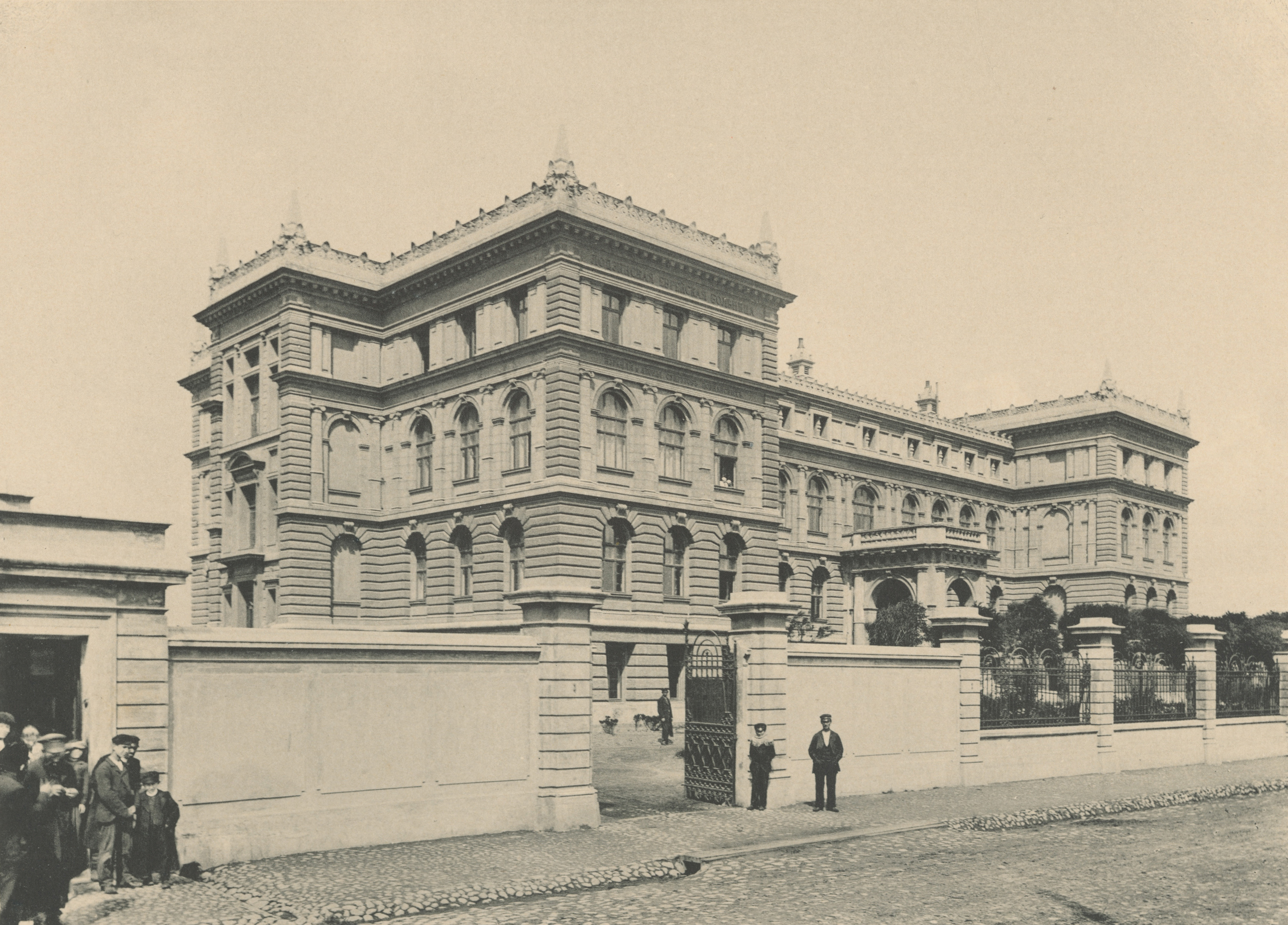
Leonia and Izrael Poznański Hospital, Łódź

== See also ==
- History of Łódź
