= Manufaktura =

Shopping complex and arts centre in Łódź, Poland

Coordinates: 51°46′44″N 19°26′59″E

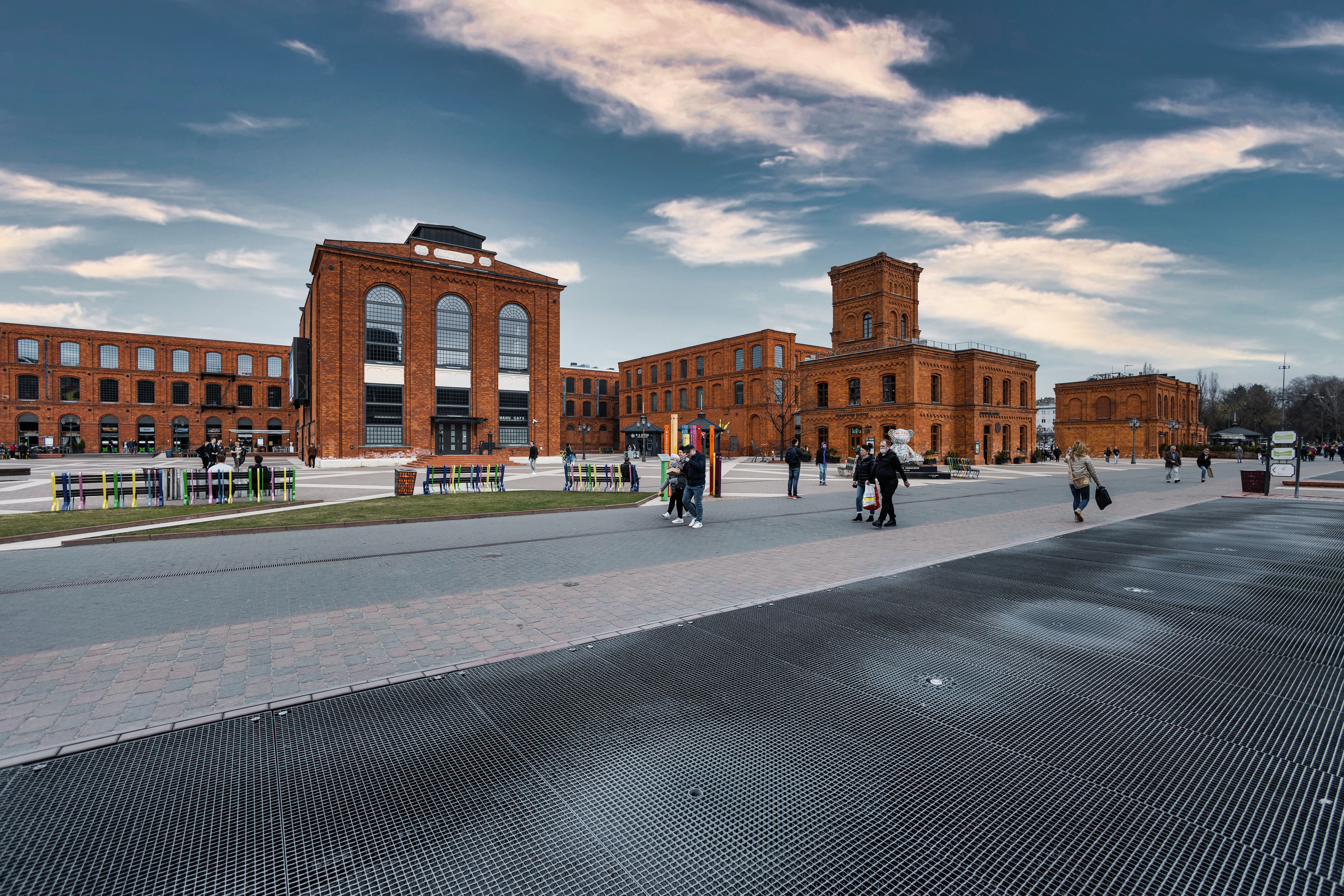
- Manufaktura Square

General information
- Type: Department store
- Architectural style: Romanesque Revival
- Location: Łódź, Poland
- Construction started: 1872
- Completed: 2006
- Owner: Union Investment Real Estate GmbH

Technical details
- Floor area: 270,000m² (2,906,256sq ft)

Design and construction
- Architect: Hilary Majewski
- Architecture firm: Virgile&Stone

The Manufaktura is an arts centre, shopping mall, and leisure complex in Łódź, Poland. A major tourist attraction of the city, it includes the largest public square in Łódź, which acts as a venue for cultural and sports events.

The Manufaktura opened on 12 May 2006, after 5 years of planning and the subsequent 4 years of construction. The total area of the complex is 27 hectares (67 acres). The work involved the renovation of an old textile factory building. The Manufaktura is located in the central part of the city, in the former industrial complex founded by Izrael Poznański, which is known also as the filming location of the novel by Władysław Reymont titled The Promised Land about the industrialization of the city of Łódź.

== History ==
In 1835, Kalman Poznański and his one-year-old son, Izrael, moved to Łódź from Aleksandrów Łódzki. Kalman owned a market stand at Stary Rynek in Łódź, where he sold various spices and fabrics. During that time, the Łódź industrialists grew in money and power - as the Russian market for fabrics, mainly cotton, increased. When Izrael Poznański inherited his father's company, he also decided to reshape and expand his business. He bought the plots around Ogrodowa Street, where he built the weaving plant in 1872. During the next 25 years, he expanded to a new complex consisting of weaving plants, spinning mills, a bleachery, power plant, finishing plant, dyehouse, warehouses, fire station and a company store. He also built houses, a hospital, a school and a community centre and canteen for thousands of his workers.

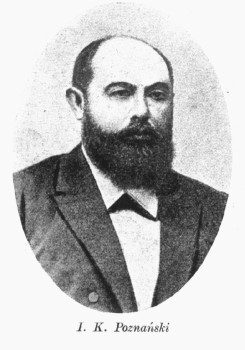
Izrael Kalmanowicz Poznański

His acquired wealth allowed him to finance many local investments – his own palace, the palaces for his sons (Maurycy and Karol), hospitals, one synagogue (no longer existing – it was destroyed by the Nazis during World War II). Poznański died in 1900 - his assets being estimated at 11 million roubles.

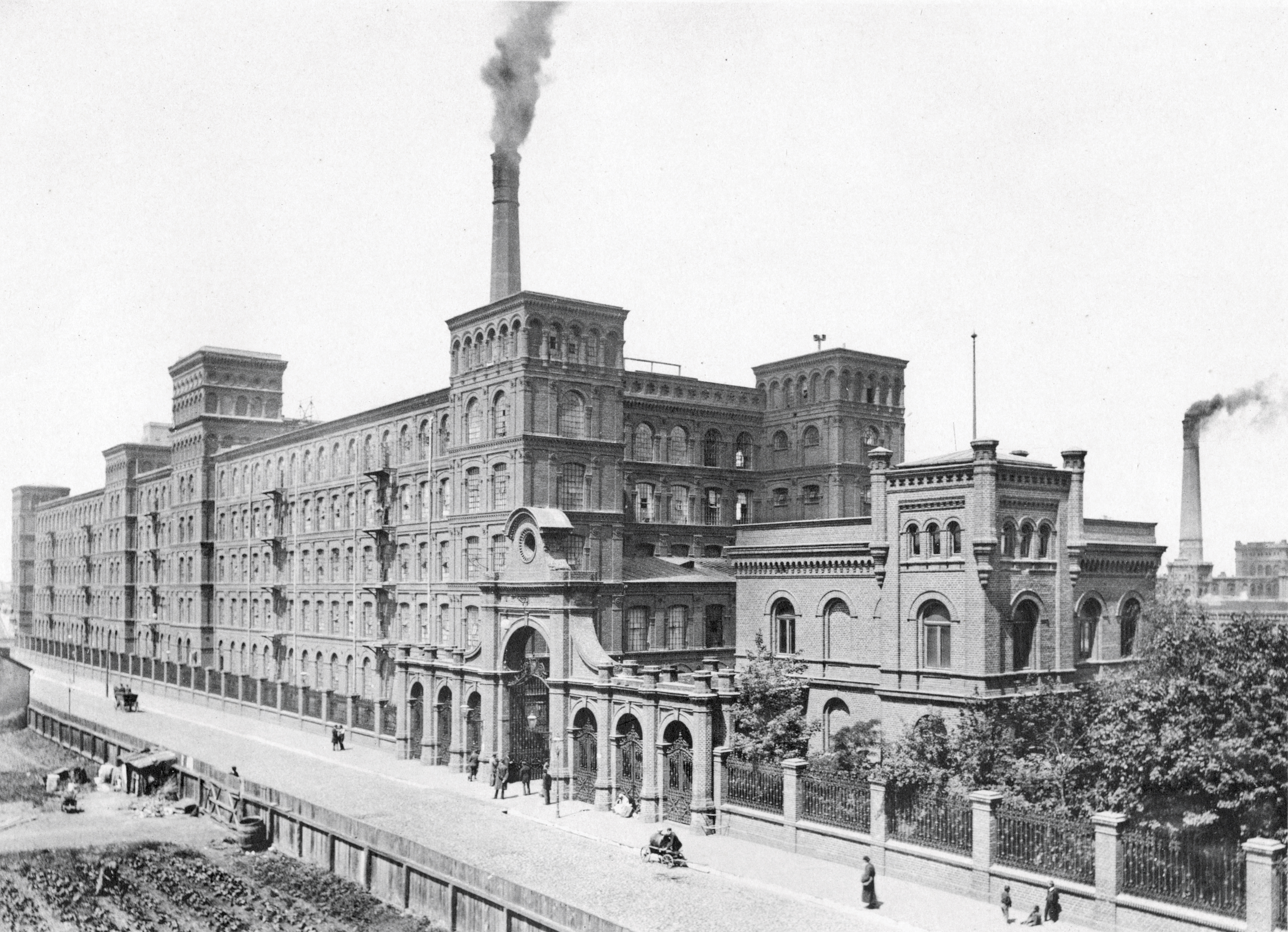
Poznański's empire

The development of industry was halted by series of events: workers' strikes (1905), World War I, the German occupation, the political changes in Russia. The last one, completely blocked Russia as a market for the products manufactured in Łódź. Then Great Crisis of the 1920s came and Poznański's company fell into debt, it was acquired in the 1930s.

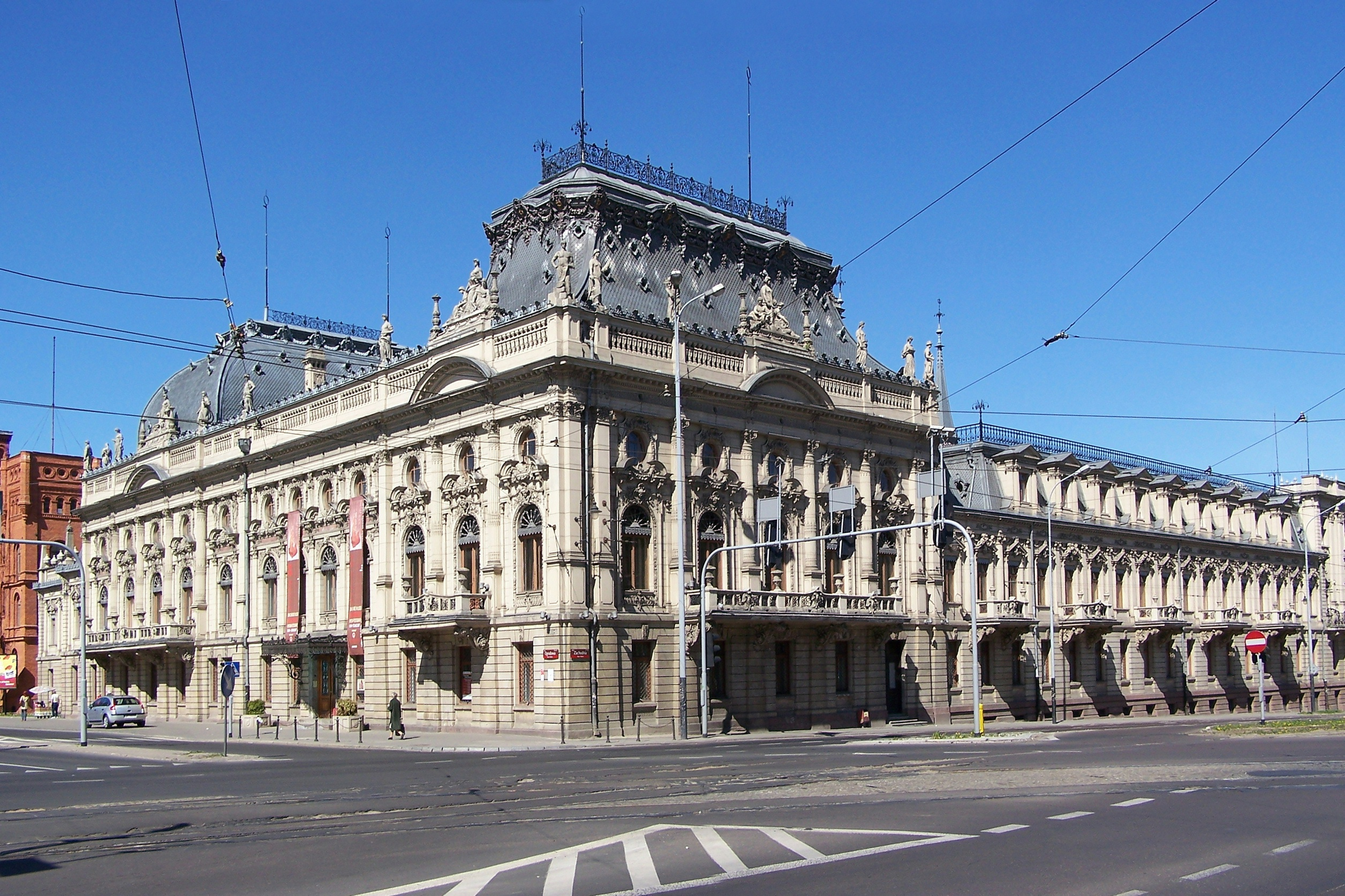
Poznański's Palace

When World War II ended, the Łódź factories underwent nationalisation and worked for the demands of communist Poland. Over the years, Poznański's complex changed name – first to The Julian Marchlewski Cotton Works and later to Poltex. In the 1970s, it came under the protection of the conservation officer. In 1975, the Poznański palace started serving as a seat for Museum of the City of Łódź. The political transition of the 1990s resulted in numerous bankruptcies, Poznański's complex included. lt was put into liquidation and its buildings fell into ruin.

The last Poltex director, Mieczysław Michalski, wanted to save the buildings from further deterioration and searched for investors willing to modernise Poznański's complex. In 1999, the complex was bought by French company Apsys. The revitalization of the complex costed ca. EUR 200 million. Manufaktura as it is known today (the name proposed by the students of Łódź universities) was opened on 16 May 2006.

== Revitalisation ==
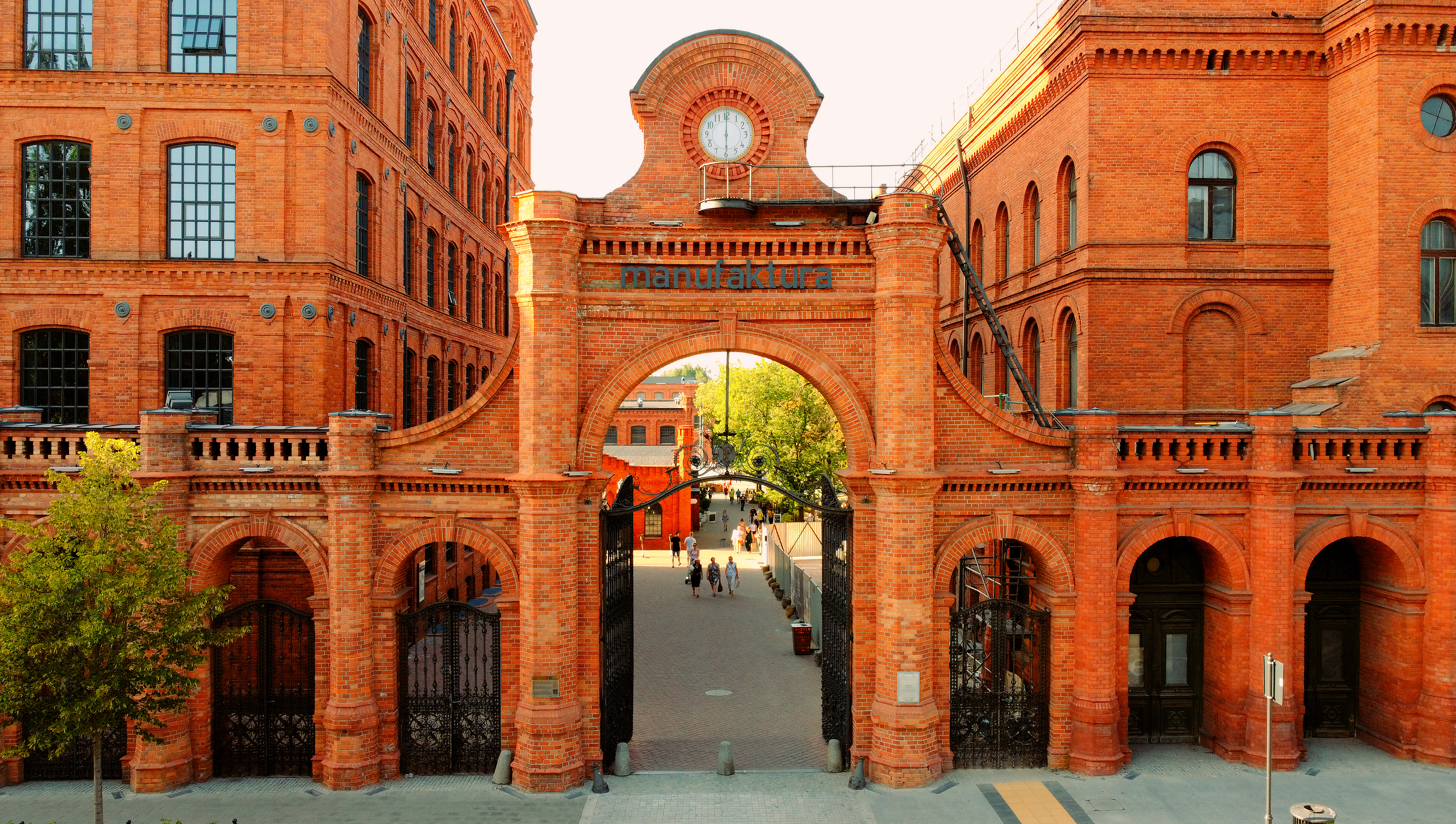
Main gate, Ogrodowa Street

In 2012, Manufaktura was bought by the German investment fund Union Investment Real Estate GmbH. The transaction is estimated at EUR 350-400 million.

The Manufaktura complex today is the direct result of Poland's largest renovation project since the reconstruction of Warsaw's Old Town in the 1950s (after World War II).

Manufaktura is a tightly knit complex of 13 historic buildings and a newly built shopping mall. The complex spans over 27 hectares. It is a combination of modern buildings made of glass and aluminium with Łódź's traditional architecture.

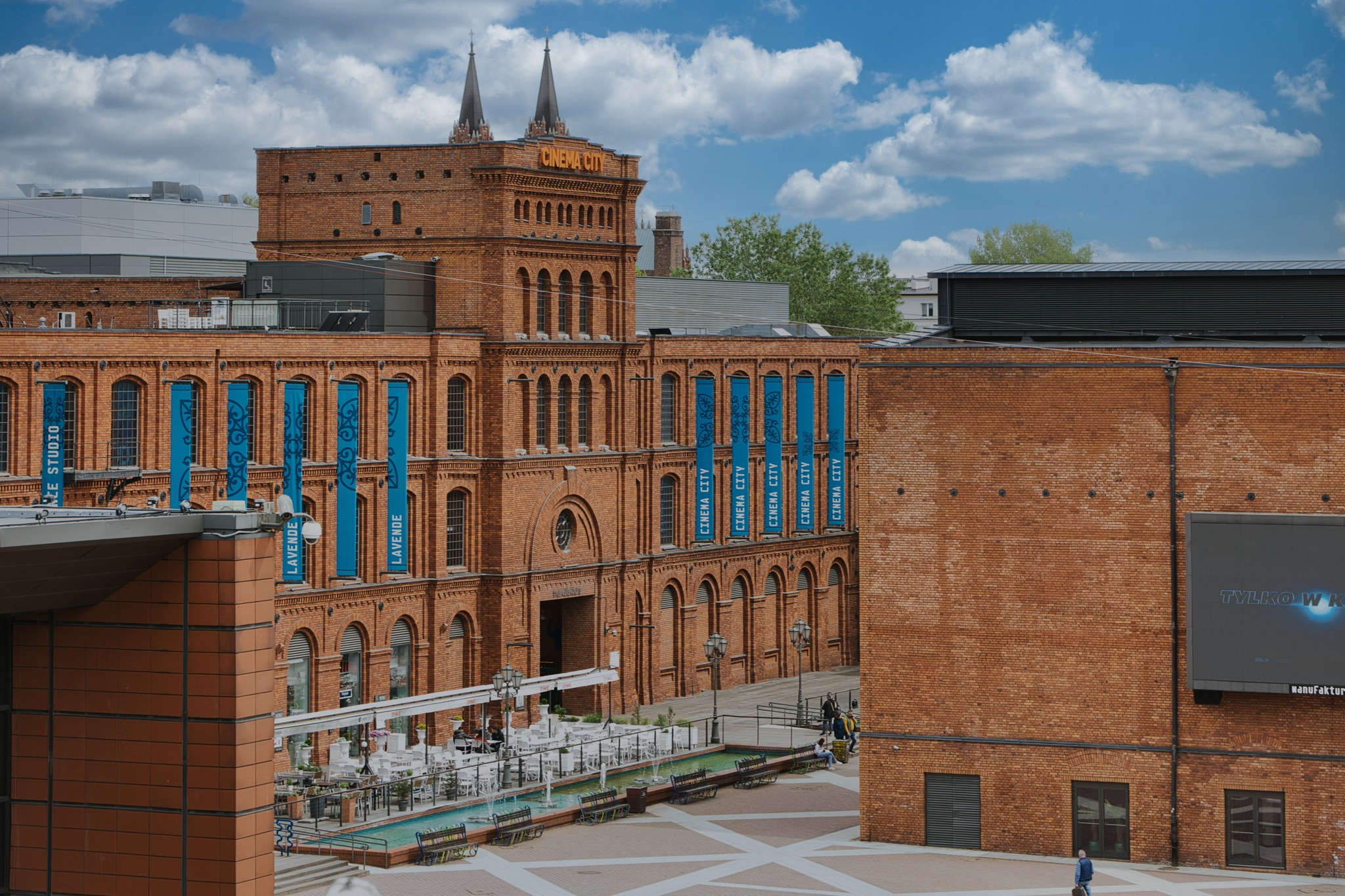
A partial view of Manufaktura Market Square, Łódź.

Revitalisation in numbers:

- over 2.5 thousand workers were engaged in restoration of historic buildings and their brick façades and in raising a modern shopping mall,
- 45,000 m^{2} brick façades renovated,
- 12,500 m^{2} metal windows renovated,
- 95,000 m^{2} new constructions erected.

The restoration of complex values was supervised by a conservation officer. In total 90,000 m^{2} historic interiors were renovated and 600 trees planted. The project costed ca. EUR 200 million.

== Organization ==
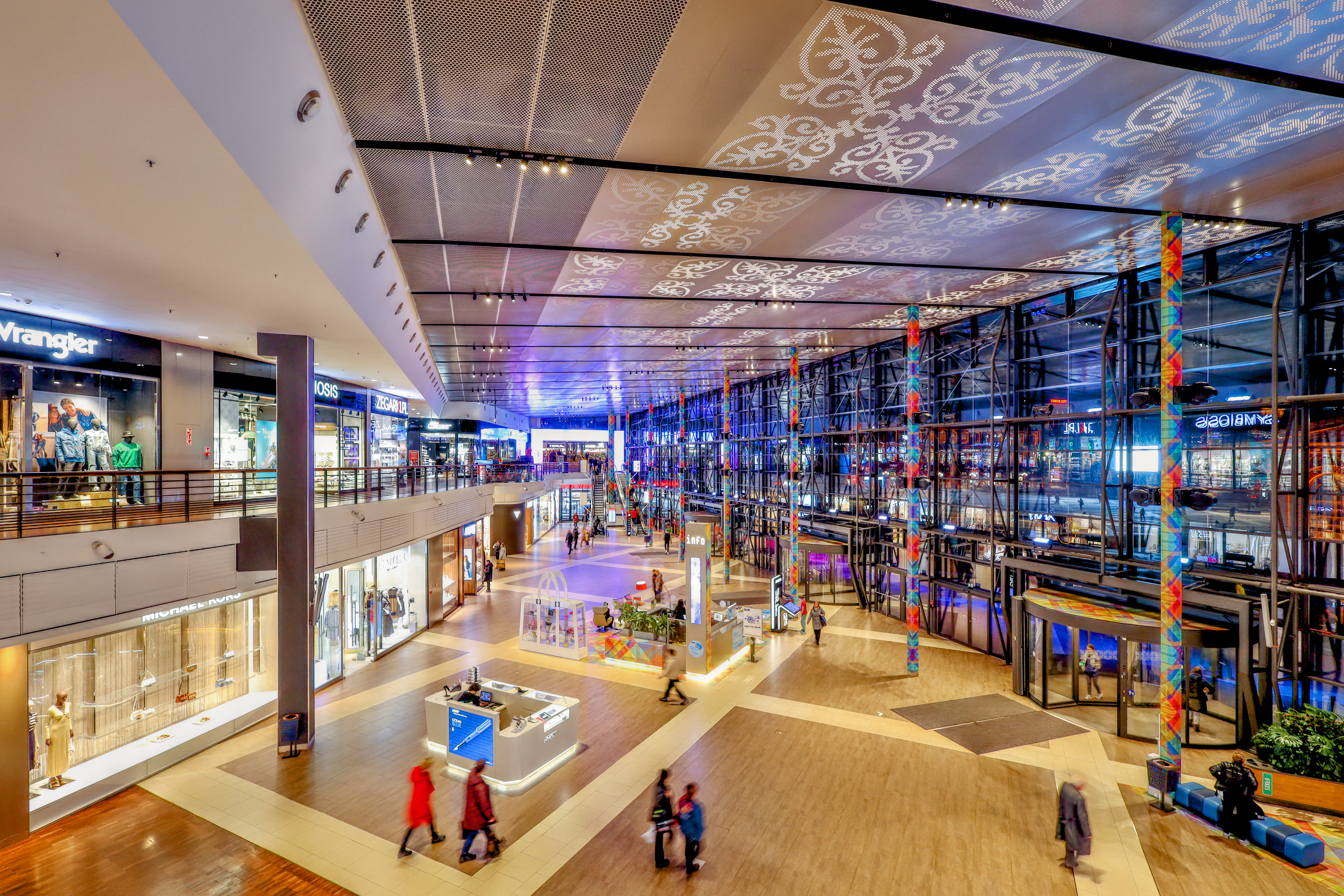
The main shopping hall

The revival was aimed at preserving the place's historical atmosphere, which is why the Manufaktura is now dominated by industrial architecture, with unplastered red brick buildings. The complex's trademark is the old, five-storey spinning mill in Ogrodowa Street, built between 1877 and 1878 (which explains the name of the complex). In 2009, a four-star Andel's hotel opened there. All the other buildings of the complex keep a similar style, but are of a lesser size. The exception to this is the main shopping hall, which is a new structure made of glass and steel. It is lower than the surrounding brick buildings, and therefore, it cannot be seen from the outside.

One of the entrances to the Manufaktura complex leads through the ancient, triumphal arch-like gate of the old spinning mill. The whole complex, with its concept of mixing the old and the new, was designed by the British firm Virgile & Stone from London, in collaboration with the French architecture firm Sud Architectes from Lyon. The original industrial buildings were designed by the Łódź architect Hilary Majewski in 1872.

== Services ==
The Manufaktura hosts over 300 stores, malls, restaurants, pastry shops, cafes, pubs and other services. The service sector extends over 12,000 m^{2}. The entire complex has a surface of 270,000 m^{2}, making it Poland's second largest only to the Old Market Square in Kraków. Its large square features Europe's longest fountain at 300 meters. Clients can go along the complex with two trambuses.

The heart of Manufaktura is the three-hectare Market which in summer is covered with beach and in winter with ice rink. The Market also serves as a host to many concerts and sport activities.

Besides the commercial area, the Manufaktura includes a restaurant complex, car parks, a cultural centre (including the MS2 branch of The Museum of Art in Łódź, a science museum, a Factory Museum, and the Museum of the City of Łódź – the last of which is situated in the neighbouring Izrael Poznański Palace), and an entertainment centre (featuring a multiplex cinema, a bowling alley, a climbing wall, a fitness club).

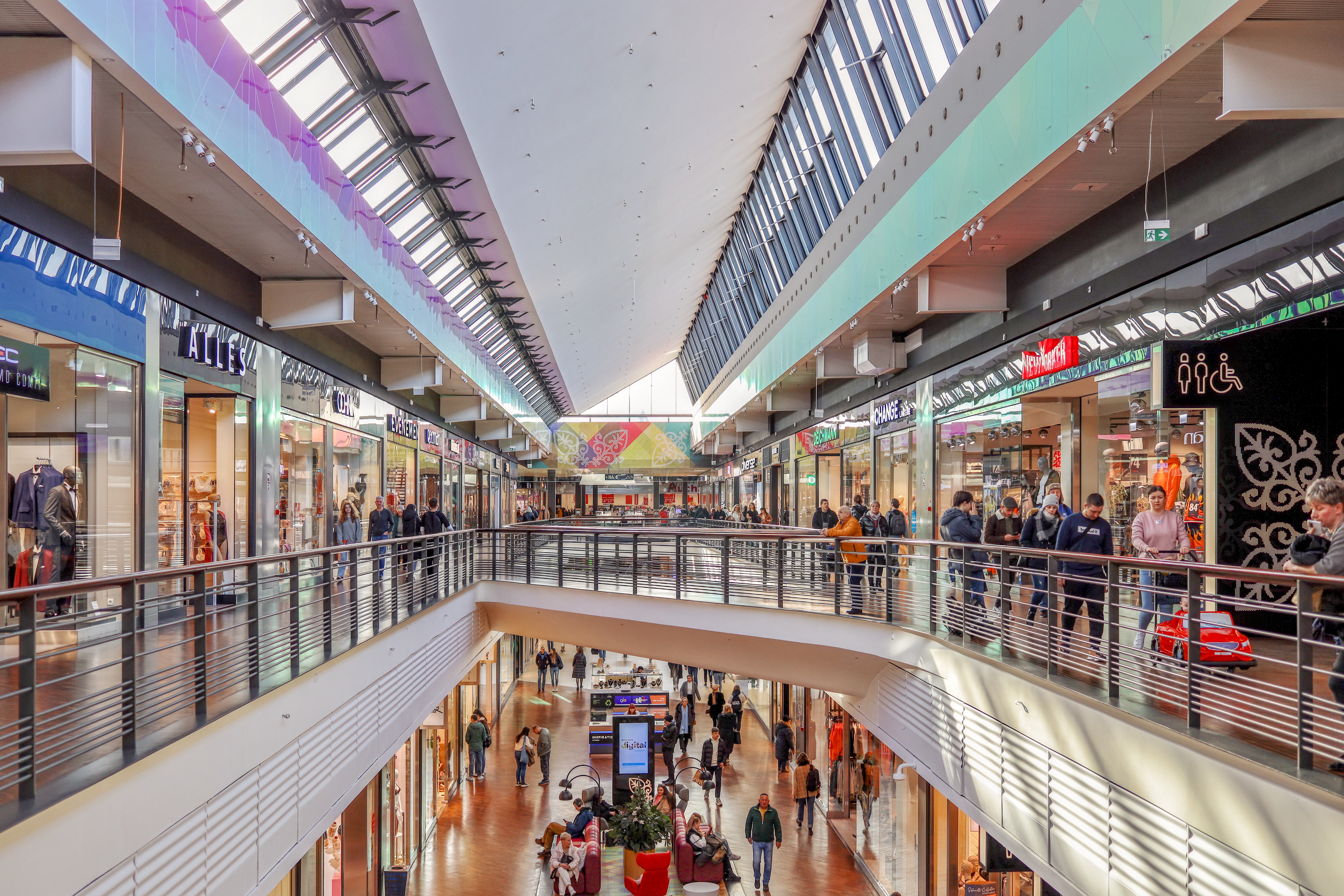
Manufaktura, shopping mall building

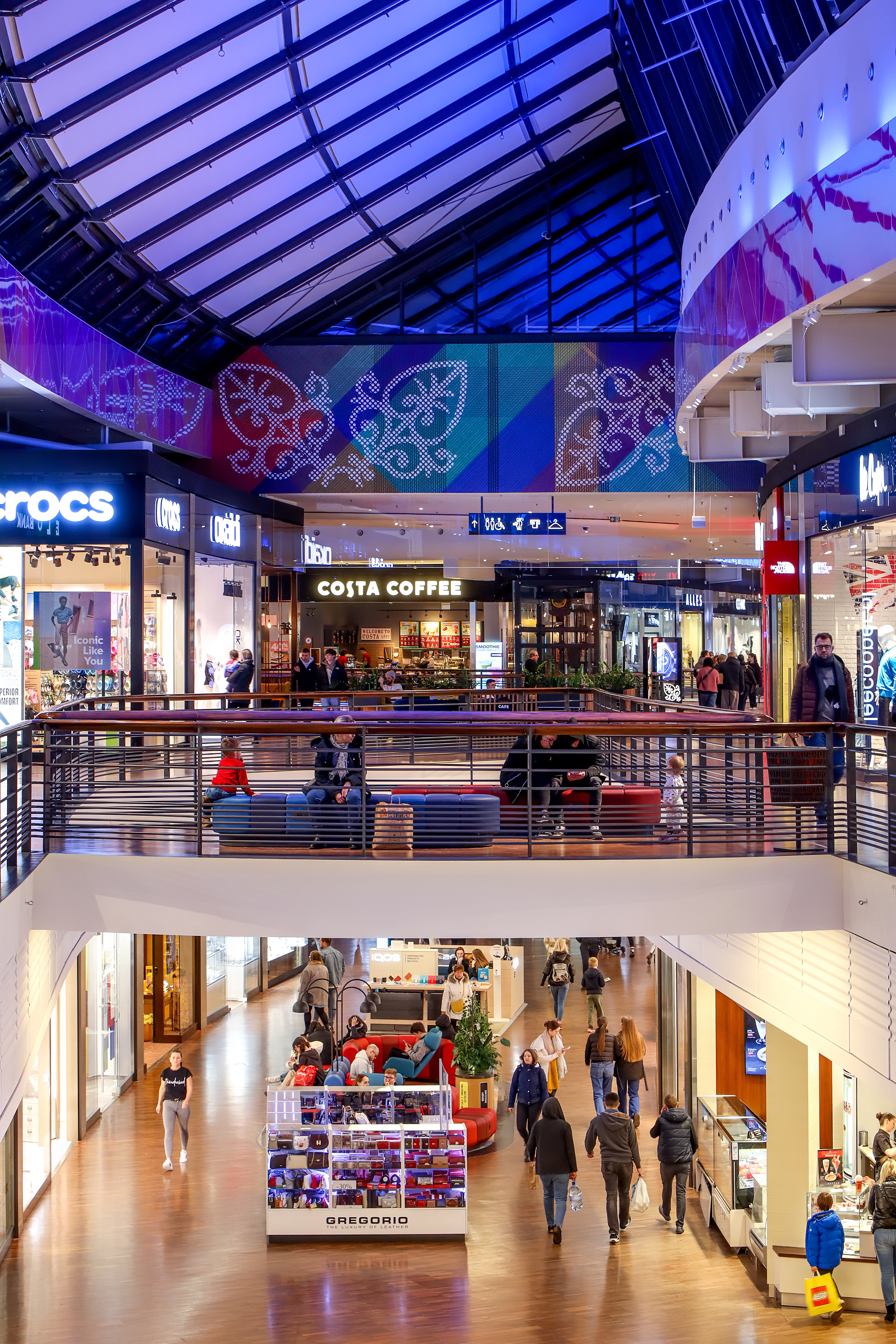
Manufaktura, shopping mall building

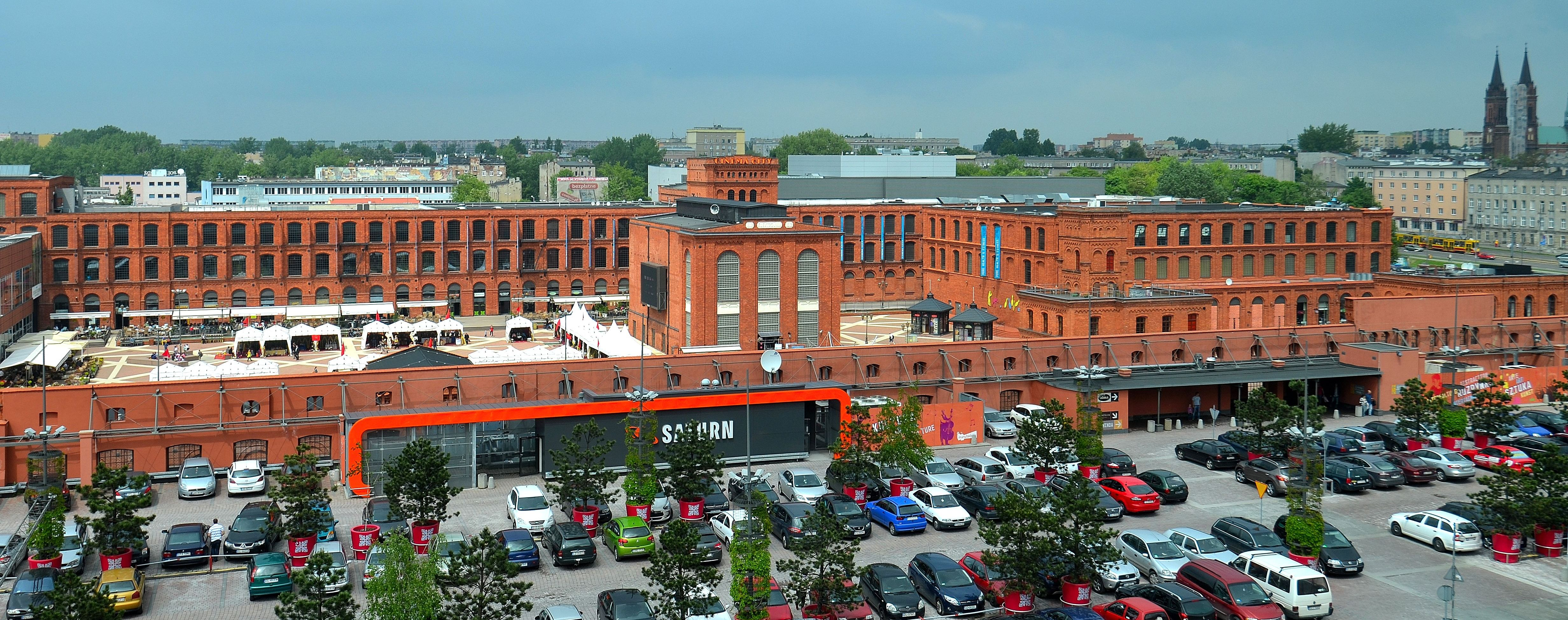
Panoramic view of the Manufaktura with its inner square (centre left)

== See also ==
- History of Łódź
