= Scheibler =

Scheibler is a surname. Notable people with the surname include:

- Carl Scheibler (1827–1899), German sugar chemist
- Christoph Scheibler (1589–1653), philosopher, author Opus Metaphysicum
- Frederick G. Scheibler Jr. (1872–1958), American architect
- Johann Scheibler (1777–1837), silk manufacturer of Crefeld, and contributor to the science of acoustics
- Karl Wilhelm Scheibler (1820–1881), German-Polish industrialist

== See also ==
- Scheibler Palace, Łódź, Poland
- Karol Scheibler's Chapel, Łódź, a major architectural work
- Scheibler Armorial, an armorial manuscript compiled from the 15th to 17th centuries
