= Edward Abramowski Street =

Street in Łódź, Poland

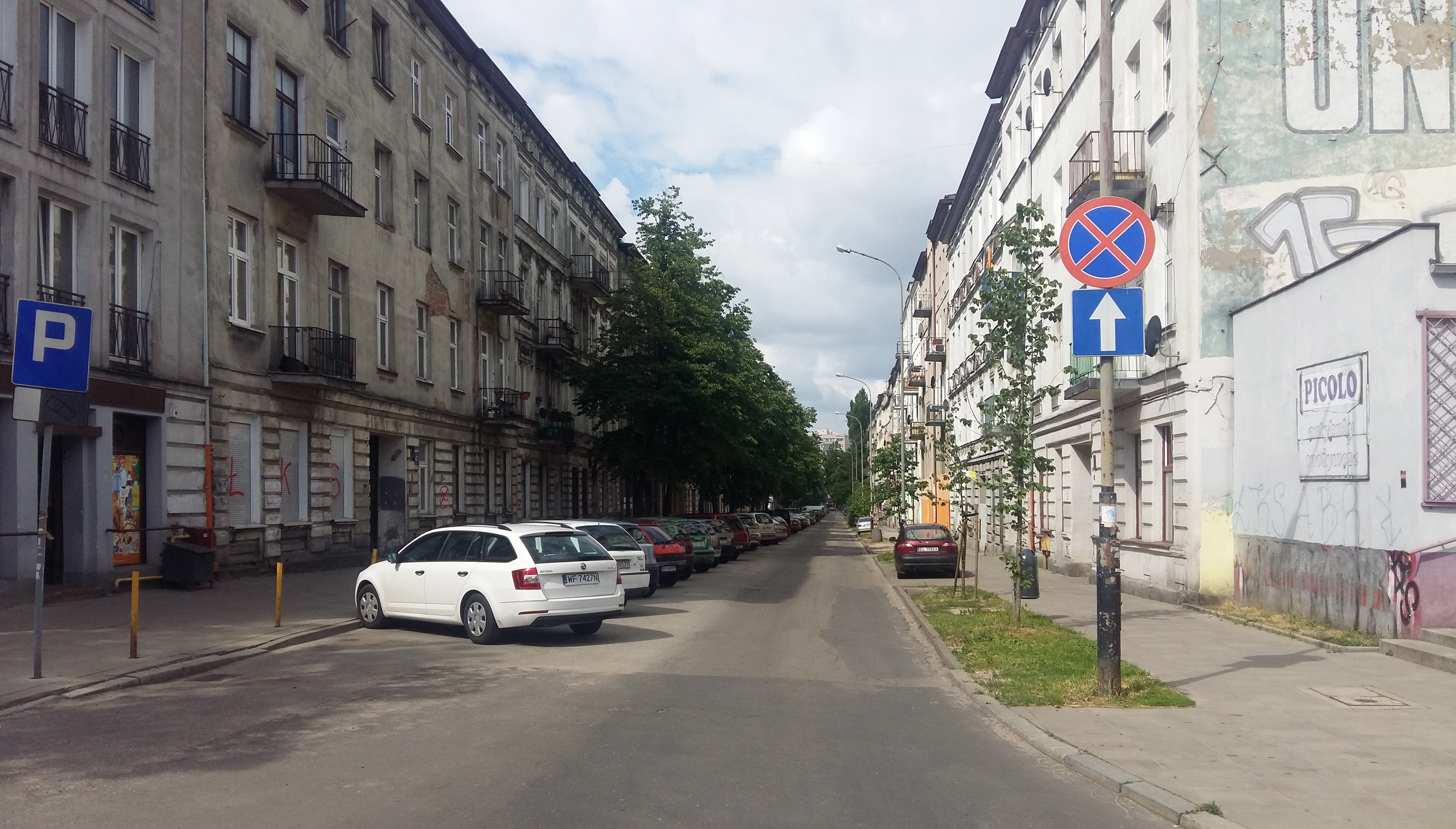
- Western end of the street, viewed from the intersection with Jan Kiliński Street toward the southwest
- Interactive map of Edward Abramowski Street
- Former name(s): Gubernatorska Street (before 1915, 1918–1925), Gouverneurstraße (1915–1918), Eduard Herbst Straße (1940), Hermann-von-Salza-Straße (1940–1945)
- Part of: Łódź Old Town, Helenów, Łódź City Centre, Fabryczna, Księży Młyn, Górniak, Chojny
- Length: 0.5 km (0.31 mi)
- Location: Łódź, Poland
- Coordinates: 51°46′10.3″N 19°27′52.1″E

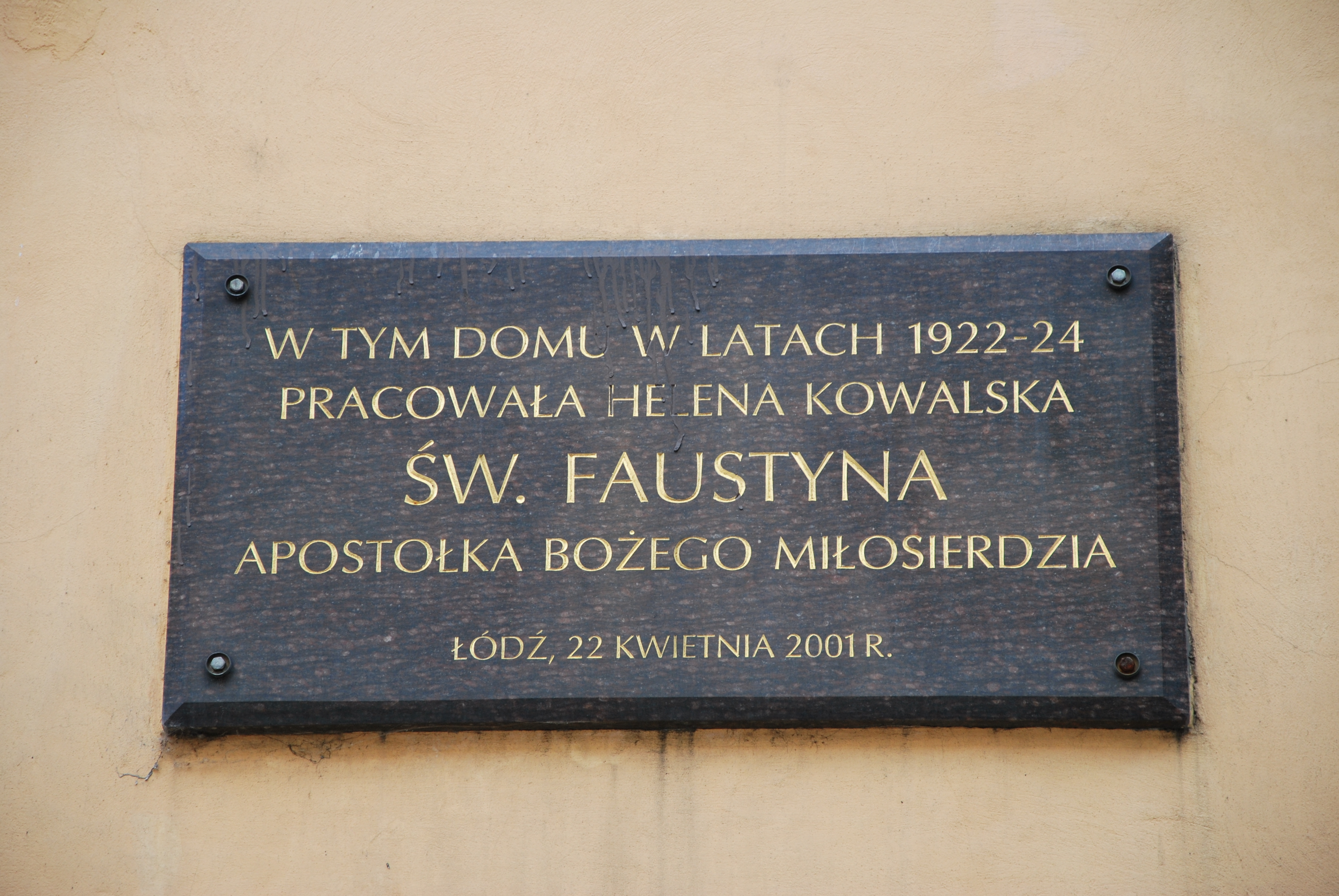
Commemorative plaque for Saint Faustina above the gate of the tenement at 29 Edward Abramowski Street

Edward Abramowski Street is a street in the southwestern part of the Downtown district of Łódź, Poland, within the Łódź City Centre area. Approximately 0.5 km long, it runs almost latitudinally from Henryk Sienkiewicz Street to Jan Kiliński Street.

Since 30 October 1974, the street has been one-way, running from Jan Kiliński Street toward Henryk Sienkiewicz Street, opposite to the direction of property numbering. It forms the initial segment of county road no. 1100E, continuing via Brzeźna, Henryk Sienkiewicz, and Radwańska streets to the intersection with Inżynierska and Parkowa streets (county road no. 1168E).

The entire street falls within the pastoral jurisdiction of the Parish of St. Stanislaus Kostka.

== History ==
=== Before 1918 ===
Measuring approximately 0.5 km, the street was established in the early 1890s. It appears on a map by Władysław Starzyński from between 1894 and 1896 as Gubernatorska Street. It certainly did not yet exist around 1880 – it is absent from the map showing the layout of the city at that time. It also does not appear on the plan of Łódź attached to Przewodnik illustrowany po Warszawie, Łodzi i okolicach fabrycznych published by Emil Skiwski in 1897. Słownik nazewnictwa miejskiego Łodzi states that it was laid out only in 1898 (as Gubernatorska Street), whereas Ryszard Bonisławski and Joanna Podolska claim that it was created only after 1898 as Gubernialna Street.

It served as a connector between the then-parallel Mikołajewska (or Nikołajewska, now Henryk Sienkiewicz) and Widzewska (now Jan Kiliński) streets. The map indicates that by the mid-1890s, the northern (even-numbered) side was mostly developed, while the southern (odd-numbered) side had only four properties near Widzewska Street. The name Gubernatorska derived from the title of an administrative official in Imperial Russia. Residents colloquially called it "Gubernia", a nickname persisting into the post-war years. From 1899, a stocking and glove factory owned by Alban Aurich operated behind the even-numbered properties, with access from Widzewska Street (now 161 Jan Kiliński Street), relocated from Mikołajewska Street (now 9 Henryk Sienkiewicz Street).

In the late 19th century, Sobczyk, a trusted cashier of industrialist Izrael Poznański, lived on the street. In 1900, the grandfather of Ryszard Bonisławski, a Polish senator, president of the Friends of Łódź Society, and local guide, resided there. Bonisławski himself lived at 34 Edward Abramowski Street for four years in the 1970s.

During World War I, under German occupation from 1915, the street was renamed Gouverneurstraße (German for "Governor Street"). In 1916, the St. Stanislaus Kostka Shelters Society operated a charitable children's institution at 2 Gubernatorska Street. After Poland regained independence in 1918, the street reverted to its Polish name, Gubernatorska.

=== 1918–1945 ===
During the interwar period, the tenement at 2 Gubernatorska Street housed the 11th Police Station, while no. 3 was occupied by the public, male Municipal Elementary School No. 16, led by Tomasz Kilański. The school was reactivated post-World War II as the co-educational Primary School No. 16. The Thalia Theatrical Association was based at no. 4, and the Łódź branch of the Ukrainian Central Committee in Poland was at no. 21. From 2 February 1923 to 29 June 1924, Helena Kowalska, later Saint Faustina, lived and worked at 29 Gubernatorska Street in Marcjanna Wieczorek's shop, known as "Mrs. Sadowska's shop".

In 1925, as part of removing traces of Russian rule, the city renamed the street after Edward Abramowski, a leftist psychologist and sociologist. On 23 June 1925, Dziennik Zarządu m. Łodzi reported:

In accordance with the resolution of the cooperative rally on the 7th inst., the Magistracy decided to request the City Council to rename Gubernatorska Street to Edward Abramowski Street, in honor of the great thinker and spiritual founder of the cooperative movement in Poland.

The City Council approved the change on 1 July 1925 during its 21st meeting (third session), held late in the evening with 49 of 75 councilors and 10 of 11 magistracy members present. The resolution stated:

XI. Regarding the Renaming of Gubernatorska Street.
The City Council, in connection with the Magistracy's motion No. 672 of 9 June 1925, resolves:
1. In recognition of the merits of the great thinker and spiritual founder of the cooperative movement in Poland, Edward Abramowski, to rename Gubernatorska Street to Edward Abramowski Street.
2. To call upon the Magistracy to implement this resolution.

In 1928, the city's planting department planted nearly 200 Turkish hazel trees along narrow lawns on both sides of the street. By 1937, the street was fully sewered. During the interwar period, Karl Dedecius lived on the street briefly during his childhood.

During World War II, German authorities introduced German street names in 1940. Edward Abramowski Street was renamed Eduard Herbst Straße after Edward Herbst, a 19th/20th-century Polish industrialist of German descent and son-in-law of Karl Wilhelm Scheibler. Later that year, after renaming the city Litzmannstadt, it was changed to Hermann-von-Salza-Straße, honoring Hermann von Salza, Grand Master of the Teutonic Order from 1209 to 1239. Ryszard Bonisławski recalled that in the early 1940s, the 0.5-km street housed 12,000 people, often in cramped conditions, leading to policing issues.

=== Post-war period ===
After the war, the street reverted to Edward Abramowski Street. The nickname "Abramka" emerged among residents and gradually replaced "Gubernia" citywide. On 29 March 1947, the city president designated a spot near Jan Kiliński Street for two car taxis and three horse-drawn carriages. Post-war, Primary School No. 16 operated at 3 Edward Abramowski Street until its closure in the mid-1960s. A Jordan garden was replaced by a residential block at number 6/10. In the 1950s, outbuildings on the southern (odd-numbered) side were demolished. Residents demanded storage units, so a wide trench was dug on the cleared land, paved with trylinka, and lined with 498 storage units and bins in embankments. Stairs led to the trench, and greenery was planted on the embankments, enclosed by openwork walls. Locals dubbed this area the "catacombs".

On 18 November 1968, the first buses of the newly launched line 77 ran along the street, connecting the southern edge of Józef Poniatowski Park to Dąbrowa. Until 29 October 1974, buses operated in both directions; after the introduction of one-way traffic, only toward the park. From 2 November 1983 to 1995, bus line 55 also ran along the street, initially from Zarzew, later from Widzew Wschód, and then Olechów, toward Obywatelska and Pienista streets.

Between 2011 and 2013, the street ranked 192nd among 362 Łódź streets for road accidents, with three incidents resulting in three injuries.

From 10 to 29 June 2013, Fabryka Sztuki organized Abramka Fest, offering free workshops (e.g., press, dance, photography) primarily for residents. In late August 2014, artists from the Pinokio Theatre performed a children's musical, Bramogranie, in an open-air setting.

The "catacombs" deteriorated over time, with some sections at risk of collapse. In 2017, the city planned to renovate the "catacombs" and trench surface, plant new shrubs, and preserve a 70-meter section of storage units (out of 400 meters), demolishing the rest to build pergolas and precast concrete walls. The project, costing an estimated 1.5 million PLN, included fencing, facade renovations, thermal modernization, and connecting 22 buildings to the city's central heating network, with the first phase (odd-numbered side) planned for 2019. Work began in early December 2017, with demolitions completed by mid-March 2018.

In 2017, two participatory budgeting proposals for the Katedralna estate were approved for 2018: "Revitalization of Downtown – reclamation of green strips on Abramowski Street" (568 votes, 140,000 PLN) and "Downtown brine tower – healthy microclimate, healthy Łódź residents" (818 votes, 248,000 PLN), to be located in the central part of the adjacent Edward Abramowski Passage.

Janusz Karol Barański, a graduate of the former Primary School No. 16 and long-time owner of the Nike bookstore-antiquary at 3 Andrzej Strug Street, recalled his post-war childhood on "Abramka":

Why did Abramowski Street have a bad reputation? It's hard to say. It was indeed restless, with assaults and beatings, but as a local, I was never bothered. [...] I come from Warsaw. My father died in the uprising. After the war, my mother, sister, and I moved to Łódź and lived on "Abramka" in a 14-square-meter apartment. Opposite was the tenement where Helena Kowalska, later Saint Faustina, worked before the war. My memories are positive; I felt good there. My mother worked three shifts, so I roamed the area with a key around my neck, riding a scooter and rolling a hoop with a hook.

=== Timeline of name changes ===
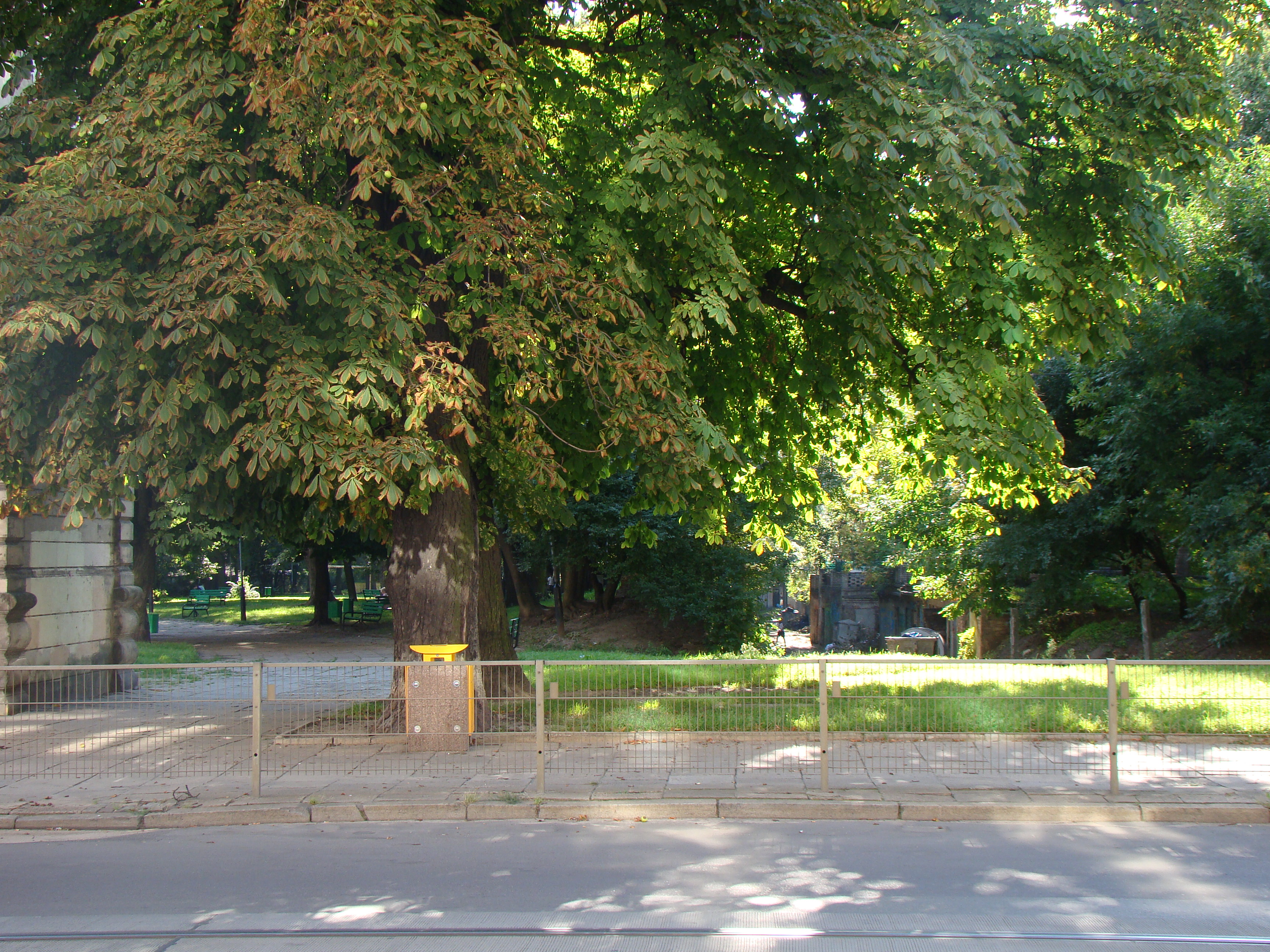
View from Jan Kiliński Street toward the "catacombs" of Edward Abramowski Street

Period	Name
Before 1915	Gubernatorska Street / Губернаторская улица
1915–1918	Gouverneurstraße
1918–1925	Gubernatorska Street
1925–1940	Edward Abramowski Street
1940	Eduard Herbst Straße
1940–1945	Hermann-von-Salza-Straße
Since 1945	Edward Abramowski Street

== Notable residents ==
- Helena Kowalska (Saint Faustina) – 29 Gubernatorska Street, from 2 February 1923 to 29 June 1924.
- Karl Dedecius – briefly during the interwar period.
- Janusz Karol Barański – post-World War II.
- Ryszard Bonisławski – 34 Edward Abramowski Street, for 4 years in the 1970s.

== In film ==
The "catacombs" behind the odd-numbered properties have attracted filmmakers, particularly students from the nearby Łódź Film School. Notable productions include:

- Close-ups of Hans Kloss (Stanisław Mikulski) in the "catacombs" for the 1968 TV series More Than Life At Stake episode Café Rose, directed by Andrzej Konic.
- The 1984 music video for Kreon from Maanam's album Mental Cut.
- Scenes from the 2011 short film Jeden krok, directed by Małgorzata Bogajewska.
- Scenes from the 2013 feature film Jaskółka, a diploma film by Bartosz Warwas, shot between 29 September and 18 November 2011.
- Scenes from the 2014 feature film Sąsiady, directed by Grzegorz Królikiewicz, shot between 28 October and 16 December 2013.

== Notable buildings ==
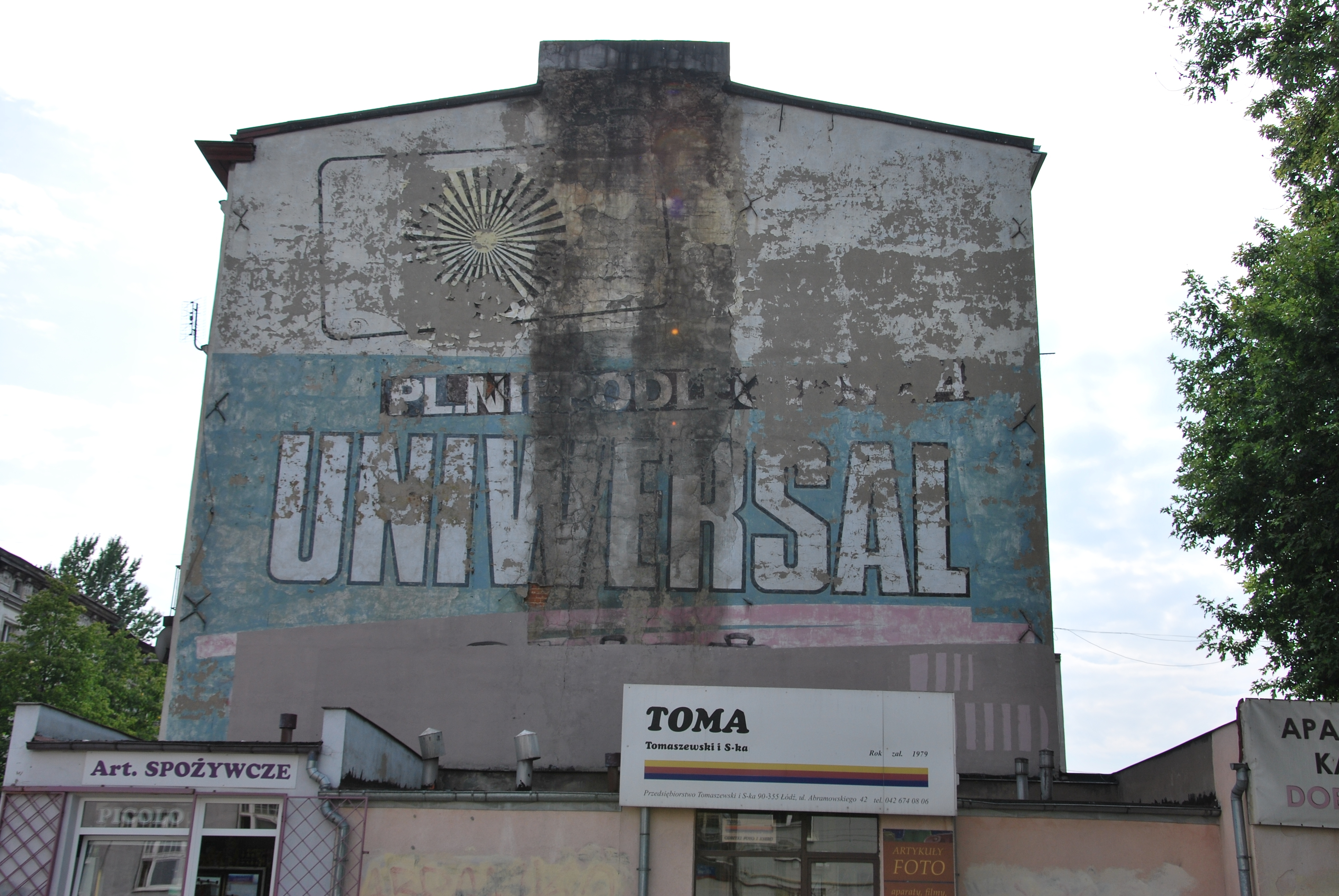
Mural on the eastern wall of the tenement at 42 Edward Abramowski Street

- No. 25 – Chapel of the Baptist Christian Church of the Republic of Poland, located on the ground floor of a side outbuilding since 1945. After the seizure of churches at 27 Nawrot and 41 Rzgowska streets, it became the sole meeting place for the congregation. During the interwar period, the Baptist Mutual Aid Association was based in this tenement.
- No. 29 – Tenement where Helena Kowalska (Saint Faustina) lived and worked from 2 February 1923 to 29 June 1924. A commemorative plaque, installed on 22 April 2001, is located above the gate.
- No. 42 – A partially damaged Polish People's Republic-era mural on the eastern wall, advertising the former Uniwersal Department Store at 4 Niepodległości Square.

As of August 2016, 13 tenements (nos. 1, 3, 7, 14, 16, 18, 23, 25, 28, 30, 31, 39, 40) and one residential building (no. 43) were listed in the municipal register of monuments. The listing for no. 30 includes the front building and eastern outbuilding; others include only the front buildings.

== Numbering and postal codes ==
- Even numbers: 2–42
- Odd numbers: 1–43
- Postal code: 90-355 (entire street)

== Nearby attractions ==
- Edward Abramowski Passage – Runs parallel to the street, extending from Brzeźna Street, along the southern side of the "catacombs", through the former garden of Stefan Barciński. Modernized in 2016 via participatory budgeting (840,000 PLN), it features a new walkway, bike path, and roller-skating track.
- Barciński Park Estate – Located between Henryk Sienkiewicz, Jan Kiliński, Edward Abramowski Passage, and Tylna Street, encompassing the former woolen factory of Salomon Barciński (est. 1884, nationalized post-war as State Woolen Industry Plant No. 3). The main spinning mill was converted into Barciński Lofts and Apartments. Five phases were completed by SGI S.A. between 2006 and 2016, with the sixth underway in 2017.
