= Edward Abramowski =

Polish philosopher, libertarian socialist (1868–1918)

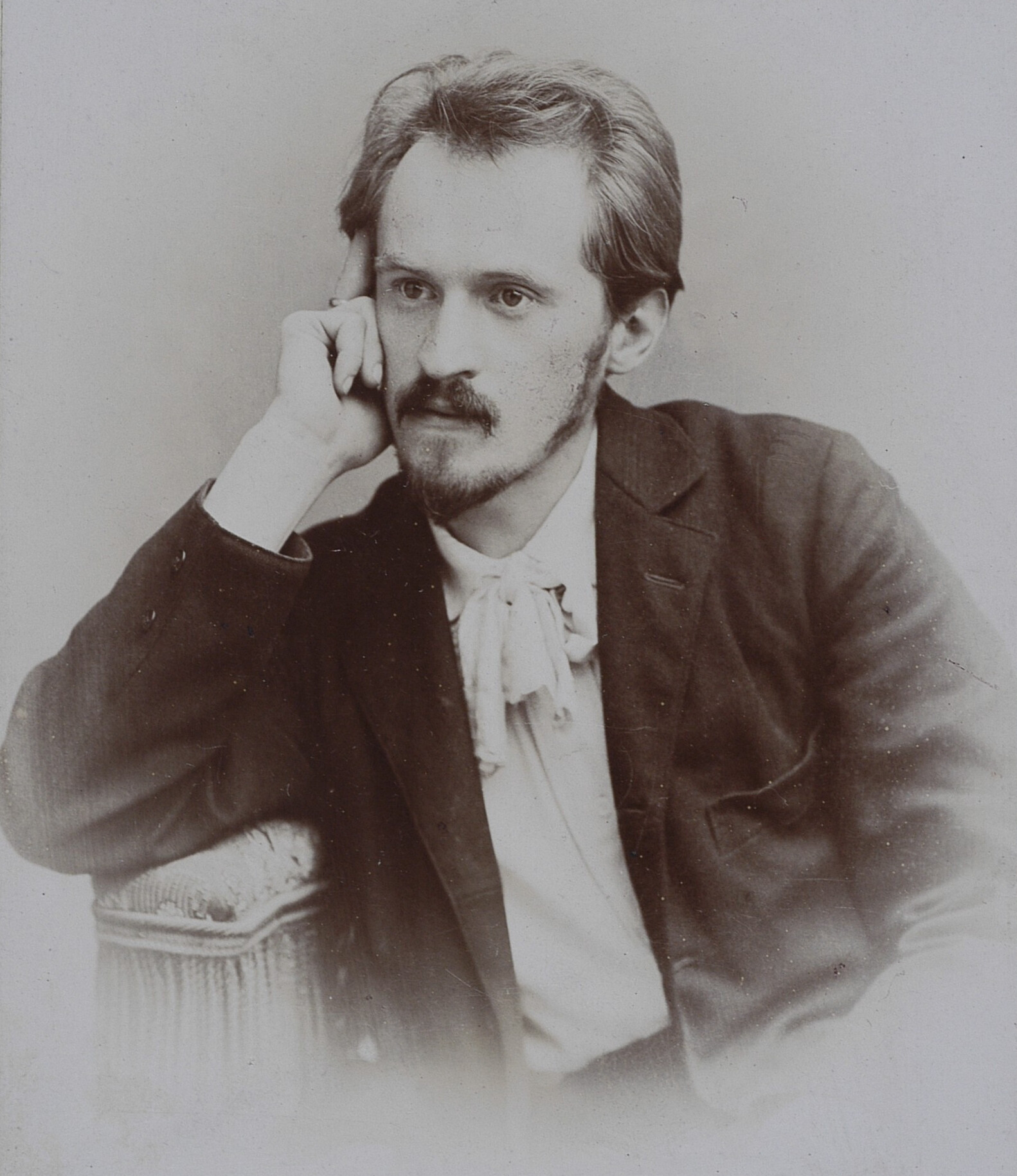
- Born: 17 August 1868; Stefanin, Vasilkovsky Uyezd, Kiev Governorate
- Died: 21 June 1918 (aged 49); Warsaw, Poland

Philosophical work
- Era: 19th-century philosophy
- Region: Western philosophy Polish philosophy
- School: Socialism, anarchism, mutualism
- Main interests: Anarcho-syndicalism, cooperativism, authority, poverty, social justice, ethics, esthetics

Józef Edward Abramowski (17 August 1868 – 21 June 1918) was a Polish philosopher, libertarian socialist, anarchist, psychologist, ethician, and supporter of cooperatives. Abramowski is also one of the best known activists of classical anarchism in Poland.

== Biography ==
Abramowski was born on 17 August 1868 in Stefanin, in the Vasilkovsky Uyezd of Kiev Governorate (present-day Ukraine) to Jadwiga and Edward. After his mother died (in 1878), he moved to Warsaw in 1879, where his teacher, Maria Konopnicka, introduced him to the members of the First Proletariat. In 1892 he took part in the Paris gathering of Polish socialists, where Polish Socialist Party was founded.

Abramowski is considered the founder of the Polish co-operative movement, promoting economic associations and initiatives. As a supporter of the cooperative movement, he founded a cooperative magazine "Społem" (Together) in 1906.

In 1915 he was given a chair in Experimental Psychology at the University of Warsaw, which he occupied until his death.

Abramowski died on 21 June 1918 in Warsaw after suffering from a serious illness. He was buried at the Powązki Cemetery.

== Legacy ==
On 19 December 1930, he was posthumously awarded the Cross of Independence by the Polish government.

== Thought ==
Influenced by Leo Tolstoy, Abramowski called himself a "state-rejecting socialist" in his most important work, Socialism & State. He went on to further his political philosophy in other works, such as The Republic of Friends, and General Collusion Against the Government. In later years, his thought increasingly tended towards anarcho-syndicalism, emphasising the importance of co-operative organization of the work force.

Alongside this politico-social theorising, he also conducted an intense research activity in the field of experimental psychology, showing a particular interest in the subconscious.

== Works ==
- Zagadnienia socjalizmu, Lviv 1899 (pod pseud.: Z.R. Walczewski)
- Etyka a rewolucja, 1899
- Socjalizm a państwo. Przyczynek do krytyki współczesnego socjalizmu, Lviv 1904
- Zmowa powszechna przeciw rządowi, Cracow 1905
- Idee społeczne kooperatyzmu 1907
- Le subconscient normal 1914
- Pisma, t. I-IV, Warszawa 1924–1928
- Filozofia społeczna. Wybór pism, Warsaw 1968
- Metafizyka doświadczalna i inne pisma, Warsaw 1980

== See also ==
- Anarchism in Poland
- History of philosophy in Poland
- List of Poles
- Cooperative banking in Poland
- Edward Abramowski Street
