= Prishchepa =

Prishchepa or Pryshchepa (Belarusian: Прышчэпа, Russian: Прищепа, Ukrainian: Прище́па) is a surname of Slavic-language origin. Notable people with this surname include:

- Dmitry Prishchepa (born 2001), Belarusian footballer
- Nadezhda Prishchepa (born 1956), Ukrainian rower
- Nataliya Oleksandrivna Pryshchepa (born 1994), Ukrainian athlete
- Nikolay Prishchepa (1900–1941), Ukrainian Red Army major general
