= Zamboni Brothers Tenement =

Building in Warsaw, Poland

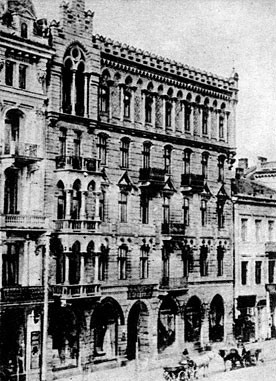
- Zamboni Brothers Tenement. Photography taken before 1939.

General information
- Status: Destroyed
- Architectural style: Gothic Revival
- Location: Warsaw, Poland, 127 Marszałkowska Street
- Construction started: 1893
- Completed: 1894
- Demolished: 1946

The Zamboni Brothers Tenement (Polish: Kamienica braci Zamboni) was a 4-storey Gothic Revival tenement residential building, located in the city of Warsaw, Poland, at 127 Marszałkowska Street. The building was designed by architect Józef Pius Dziekoński, and built in 1894. It was destroyed in 1944 during the Second World War and its ruins were deconstructed in 1946.

== History ==
Zamboni Brothers Tenement was one of two tenements built in place of the Pod filarkami Manor House, which was the last manor house in central Warsaw. The building existed until 1893, when it was deconstructed to be replaced by tenements.

The Zamboni Brothers Tenement was designed in Gothic Revival style by architect Józef Pius Dziekoński, and built between 1893 and 1894. It was owned by confectioner Jakub Zamboni, who run Lourse chain of confectioneries. One of which was located in the building.

On 18 August 1944, during the Second World War, the building was hit by a projectile. According to the statements of one of the survivors, in the event died almost 60 people. In 1944, following the fall of the Warsaw Uprising, and the following destruction of Warsaw done by occupying German forces, the building had been burned down. The building remains had been deconstructed in 1946.

== Design and characteristics ==
The Zamboni Brothers Tenement was located at 127 Marszałkowska Street, and had 4 storeys. Its elevation was covered in colorful tiles. Its first floor had large ogee-arched shopwindows, and on higher levels, it had 2-storeys-high loggias. It also had traceries and balconies with forged balustrades. The top of the building featured a stepped gable and Gothic attic.
