= Nikolay Prishchepa =

Soviet major general (1900–1941)

Nikolay Andreyevich Prishchepa
- Born: 14 April 1900; Bolshaya Sultanovka, Vasilkovsky Uyezd, Kiev Governorate, Russian Empire
- Died: 14 August 1941 (aged 41) near Buda-Koshelyovo, Byelorussian Soviet Socialist Republic, Soviet Union
- Allegiance: Russian SFSR; Soviet Union
- Branch: Red Guards; Red Army (later Soviet Army)
- Service years: 1918–1941
- Rank: Major general
- Commands: 61st Rifle Division
- Conflicts: Russian Civil War; World War II

Nikolay Andreyevich Prishchepa (Russian: Николай Андреевич Прищепа; 14 April 1900 – 18 August 1941) was a Ukrainian Red Army major general killed in World War II.

A revolutionary worker, Prishchepa joined the Red Guards and then the Red Army in early 1918, serving with a railway unit during the Russian Civil War and the Polish–Soviet War. He became a junior commander during the early 1920s, serving with units stationed in Ukraine. Prishchepa held staff and command positions during the late 1930s and became commander of the 61st Rifle Division as the Red Army expanded before Operation Barbarossa. He led the division in a temporarily successful counterattack during the Battle of Smolensk, but died of severe wounds received while attempting to escape from encirclement several weeks later.

== Early life and Russian Civil War ==
Prishchepa was born on 14 April 1900 in the village of Bolshaya Sultanovka, Vasilkovsky Uyezd, Kiev Governorate. He worked at the Kiev Arsenal and during the October Revolution in November 1917 fought as part of a worker's detachment in the suppression of an anti-soviet uprising in Kiev, then worked at a railroad in the city. During the Russian Civil War, he joined the 1st Kiev Red Guards Detachment on 18 January 1918, and was seconded to a railway guard detachment, transferring to the Red Army in February. After the German occupation of Kiev, the detachment retreated to Bryansk, subsequently fighting against the Ukrainian People's Army, Polish troops, and the Armed Forces of South Russia. Wounded in battles near Kiev on 1 October 1919, Prishchepa was evacuated to a hospital until February 1920. During March he was assigned to the Expeditionary Railroad Detachment of the headquarters of the 12th Army, sent to the front in April. As a squad and platoon leader, he fought in the Polish–Soviet War on the approaches to Zhitomir.

== Interwar period ==
The detachment was reorganized as a food requisitioning detachment in July 1921, and Prishchepa continued to serve with it as a food requisitioning representative. As part of the detachment, he fought against the Ukrainian insurgents led by Yuriy Tyutyunnyk. Seconded to Kiev, he was sent to the Tarashchansky Uyezd Food Committee as head of the instructor department of the Tetyev Food Commission. Prishchepa studied at the 5th Kiev Military Infantry School from September 1921, graduating in early September 1924. He was assigned to the 152nd Rifle Regiment of the 51st Rifle Division of the Ukrainian Military District, serving as a rifle and machine gun platoon commander, and as an assistant company commander. Transferred to the Kiev Infantry School in October 1927, he served there as a platoon and course leader.

Seconded to Korosten and placed at the disposal of the 51st Chief Directorate of Construction Work, Prishchepa served with it as assistant commander of a separate machine gun battalion, assistant head of economic troops and acting head of a fortified region detail. Transferred to command a separate machine gun district of the 54th Fortified Region during January 1933, he entered the main faculty of the Frunze Military Academy in April of that year. Upon graduation in November 1936, Prishchepa, now a captain, was sent to become head of the 1st (operational) section of the staff of the 61st Rifle Division, stationed at Penza with the 12th Rifle Corps. He temporarily served as division chief of staff between April and December 1938, and from February 1939 commanded its 330th Rifle Regiment. Prischepa, promoted to colonel by 1941, was appointed division commander on 23 August of that year. Just before the beginning of Operation Barbarossa, the June 1941 German invasion of the Soviet Union, the division became part of the 66th Rifle Corps.

== World War II ==
After the beginning of Operation Barbarossa, the division and its corps became part of the 21st Army of the Reserve of the Supreme Command in late June. The 61st was soon transferred to the 63rd Rifle Corps, and in early July began fighting against advancing German forces. The troops of the army repulsed German attacks during the Battle of Smolensk near Rogachev and Zhlobin and briefly recaptured them on 13 July after a counterattack. For his leadership during the counterattack, Prishchepa was promoted to major general on 31 July, along with the other two division commanders of the corps; this was the only occasion during the war when division commanders of a single corps all received simultaneous promotions. The 61st, fighting alongside the 167th Rifle Division, held its positions against German troops that crossed the Dnieper and advanced towards Bobruisk, but was surrounded with the rest of the corps by a German counterattack. During fierce defensive fighting near the village of Selivanovo, Prishchepa was seriously wounded on 14 August by a bullet that damaged his spinal cord, losing the use of his legs. He was evacuated from the encirclement in a GAZ-AA truck, which was fired upon by German troops, after which Prishchepa was carried into a GAZ-M1 car. Driven toward Buda-Koshelyovo, the group he was with took refuge in the forest after they found that German troops had reached the area. Prishchepa died of his wounds on the morning of 18 August and was buried in the forest. Survived by a wife and son, he was reburied in the village of Morozovichi, Gomel Oblast during the 1960s.
