= Józef Pius Dziekoński =

Polish architect (1844–1924)

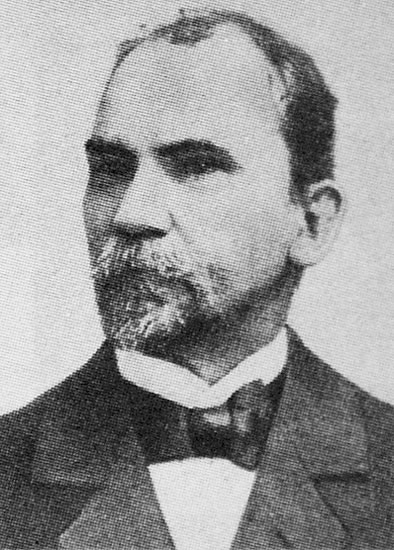
- Born: May 5, 1844; Płock, Congress Poland, Russian Empire
- Died: February 4, 1927 (aged 82); Warsaw, Second Polish Republic
- Occupation: architect
- Practice: Imperial Academy of Arts, Sankt Petersburg
- Buildings: Cathedral Basilica of the Assumption of the Blessed Virgin Mary in Białystok; Karol Scheibler's Chapel in Łódź; Church of the Holiest Saviour in Warsaw; Radom Cathedral

Józef Pius Dziekoński (born 5 May 1844, Płock – died 4 February 1924, Warsaw) was a Polish architect and heritage conservator, a representative of the 19th-century historicism. He became the first dean at the Faculty of Architecture of the Warsaw University of Technology and co-founded the Society for the Protection of Historical Monuments (TOnZP).

== Life and career ==
He was born on 5 May in Płock, in the Russian-partitioned part of Poland. After graduating from high school in Warsaw in 1860, he enrolled at the School of Fine Arts. In 1866, he began his studies at the Imperial Academy of Arts in Sankt Petersburg. In 1871, he obtained the architecture degree (III Class) and in 1902, he received the title of an academician. He mostly specialized in sacral architecture and was a precursor of the so-called Vistula-Baltic style. Since 1893, he collaborated with the Committee on Research into History of Art in Poland (Komisja do Badań Historii Sztuki w Polsce). In 1906, he was one of the co-founders of the Society for the Protection of Historical Monuments (Towarzystwo Opieki nad Zabytkami Przeszłości). Among his notable pupils were architects such as Franciszek Lilpop, Hugo Kruder, Czesław Domaniewski, Józef Holewiński, Zdzisław Mączeński, Feliks Michalski, Aleksander Nieniewski, and Ludwik Panczakiewicz.

He was awarded the Commander's Cross of the Order of Polonia Restituta on 2 May 1922 as well as the Italian Order of St. Gregory the Great. In 1919, he received an honorary doctorate from the University of Lviv.

He died on 4 February in Warsaw and was buried at the Powązki Cemetery.

== Selected projects ==
- Cathedral Basilica of the Assumption of the Blessed Virgin Mary in Białystok
- John the Baptist Church in Bielsko
- Church of the Sacred Heart of Jesus in Błonie
- Church of the Sacred Heart of Jesus in Boby-Wieś
- Church of Saint Bartholomew in Domaniewice
- Church in Dębe Wielkie
- Saint Roch Church in Długosiodło
- Saint Stanisław Church in Dąbrowa Wielka
- St. Catherine Church in Grybów
- Church in Garbów
- Collegiate church of Transfiguration in Garwolin
- Church in Jadów
- Church in Jakubów
- Church in Janowiec Kościelny
- Church of the Assumption of the Virgin Mary in Kałuszyn (1889-1893)
- Church in Kazimierz
- Holy Trinity Church in Kołbiel
- Church in Kamieńczyk
- Church in Kamionna
- Church in Konstancin-Jeziorna
- Church in Konstantynów
- Church of the Nativity of the Virgin Mary in Kosów Lacki
- Saint Bartholemew Church in Kulesze Kościelne
- Holy Trinity Church in Latowicz
- Staint Margaret Church in Leoncin
- Karol Scheibler's Chapel, Łódź, (co-authored with Edward Lilpop)
- Church of the Transfiguration in Malowa Góra
- Reconstruction and restoration of the Church of the Nativity of the Virgin Mary in Mińsk Mazowiecki
- St. Adalbert Church in Nasielsk
- Saints Peter and Paul Church in Pniewo
- Church of the Holy Family in Przedecz (1904-1909)
- Glogiers' House in Radom, Sienkiewicz Street 12, (1914)
- Cathedral of the Protection of the Blessed Virgin Mary in Radom
- Sacred Heart of Jesus church in Skarżysko-Kamienna
- St. Anne and St. Martin Church in Stryków (co-authored with Zdzisław Mączeński)
- Church of St. Matthew the Apostle Evangelist in Stulgiai
- Saint Nicholas Church in Sulerzyż
- Church of St. Francis of Assisi in Šilalė
- St. John the Baptist Church in Tczów
- Reconstruction of St. Alexander's Church, Warsaw, Three Crosses Square
- St. Florian's Cathedral in Warsaw
- Zamboni Brothers Tenement, Warsaw (1894)
- Church of Saint Stanisław the Bishop in Warsaw
- Church of the Holiest Saviour, Warsaw (together with Władysław Żychiewicz and Ludwik Panczakiewicz)
- Pedestal of the Adam Mickiewicz Monument in Warsaw
- Renovation of Church of St. Anne in Vilnius
- Holy Family Church in Zakopane

== Gallery ==
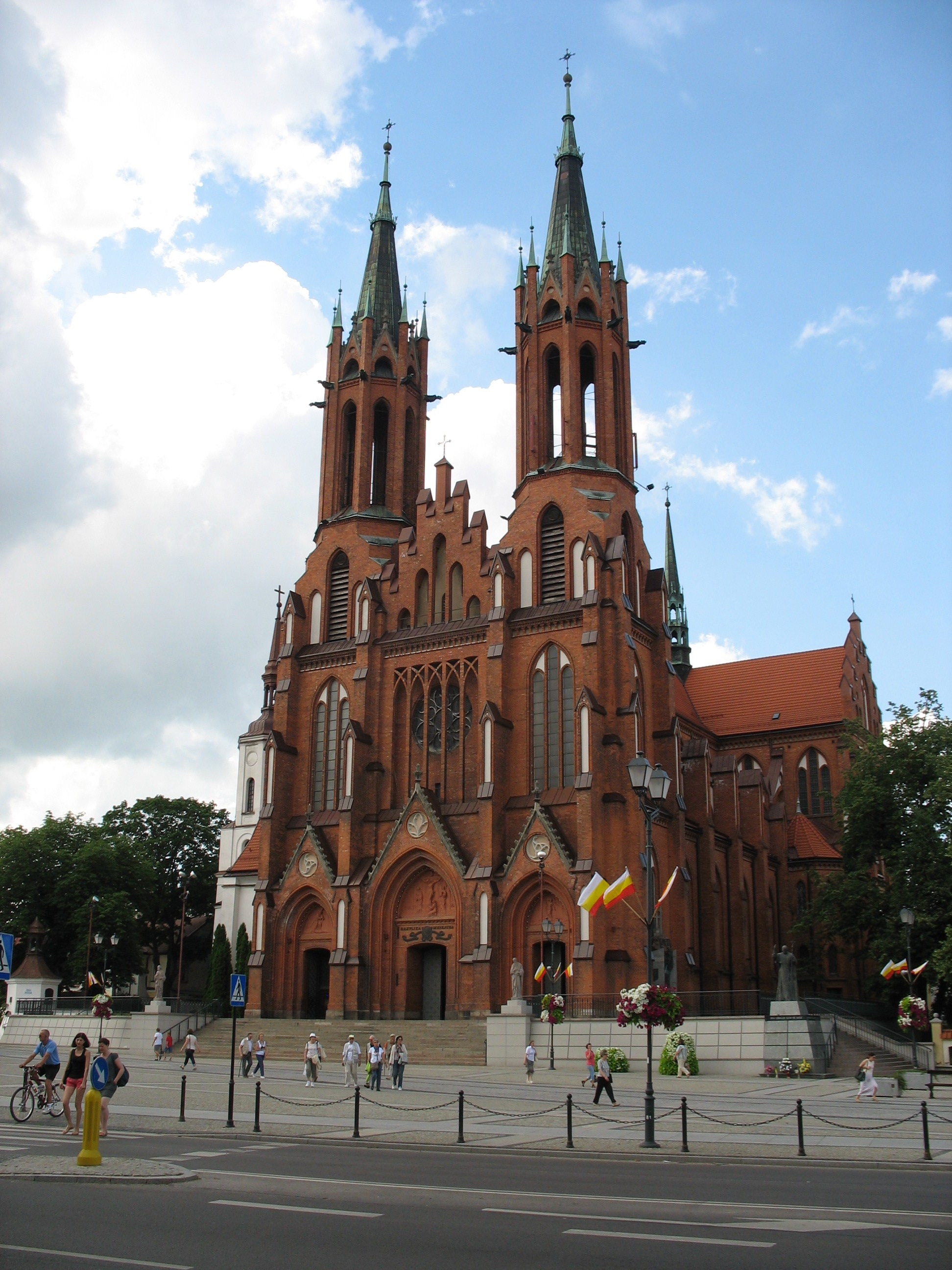
Bialystok Cathedral Basilica

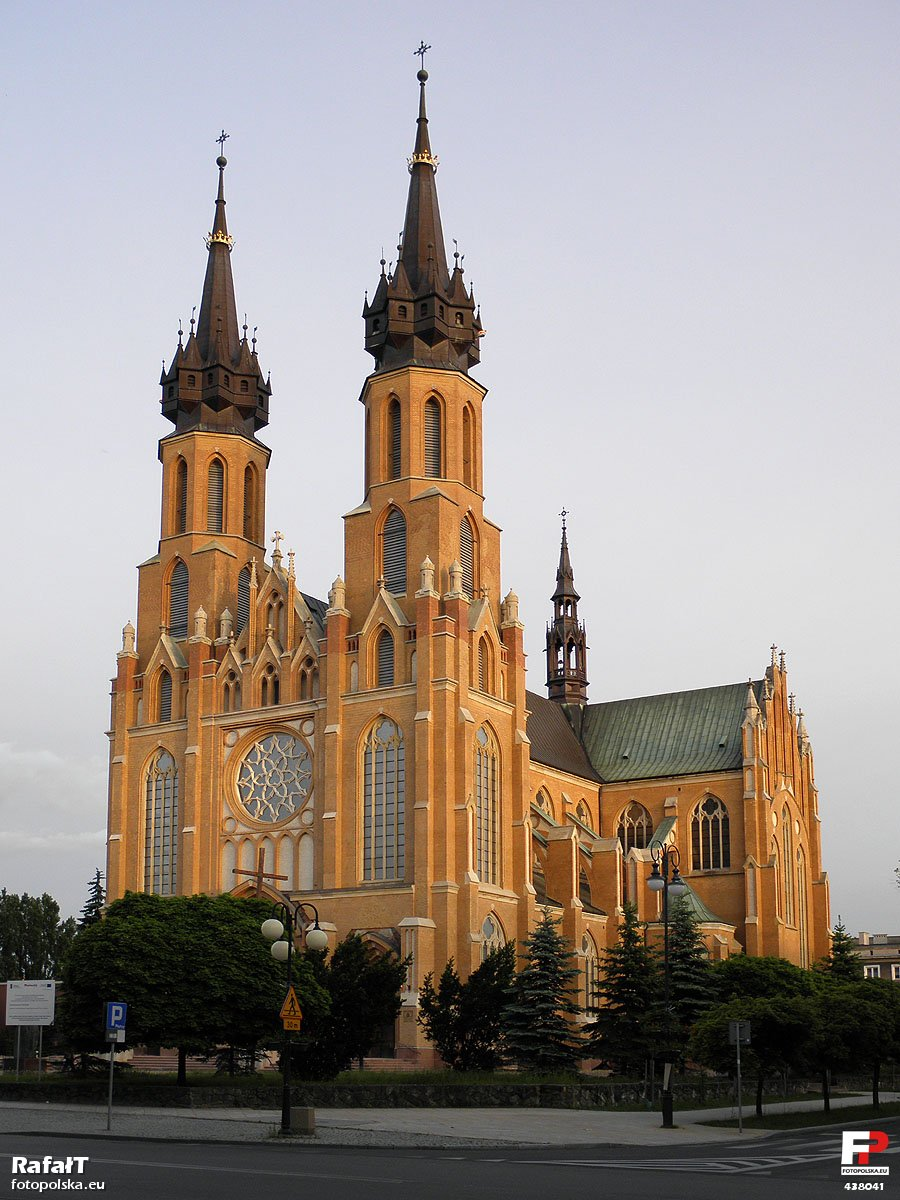
Radom Cathedral

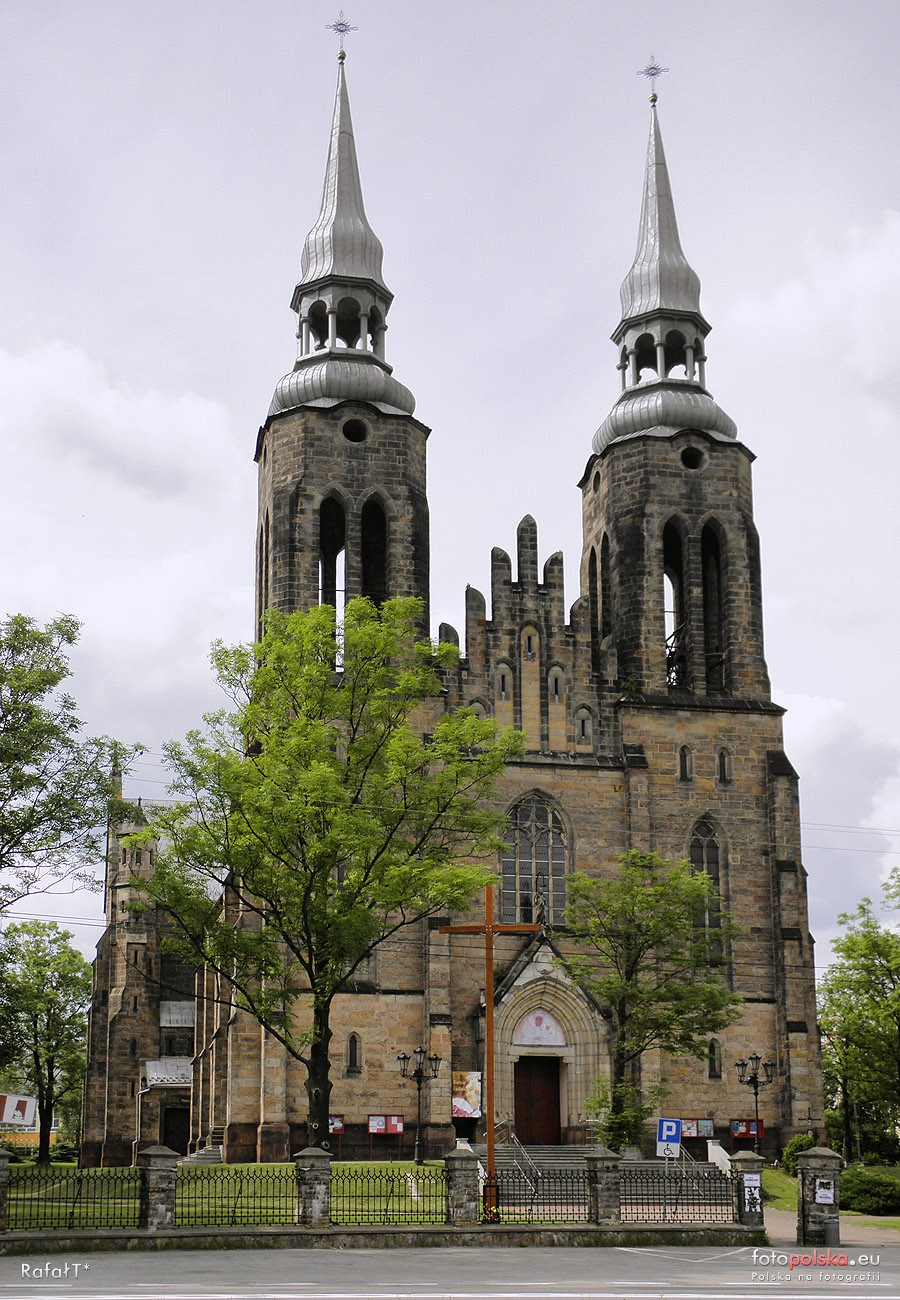
Sacred Heart of Jesus Church in Skarżysko-Kamienna

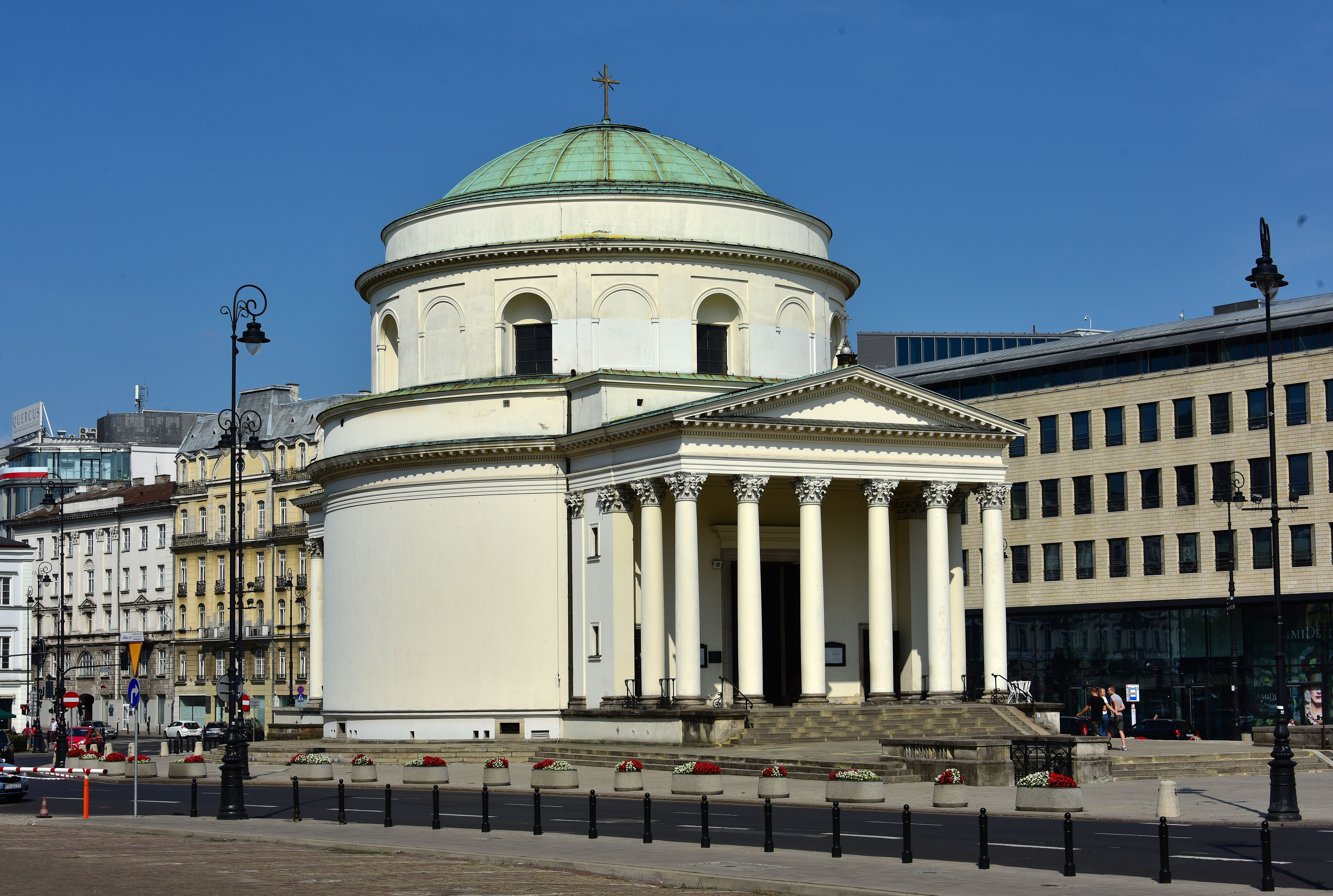
St. Alexander's Church, Warsaw (reconstruction)

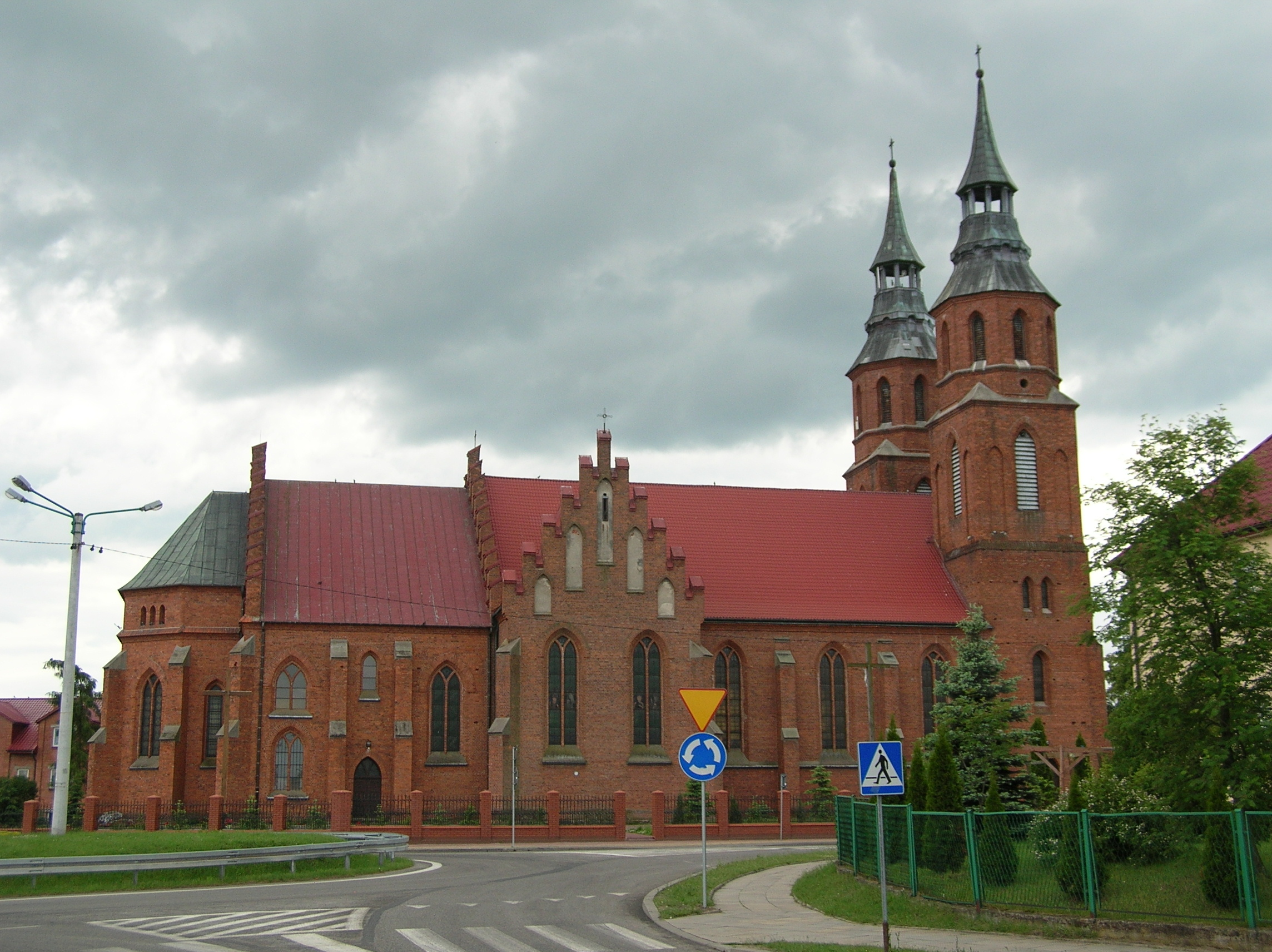
St. John the Baptist Church in Tczów

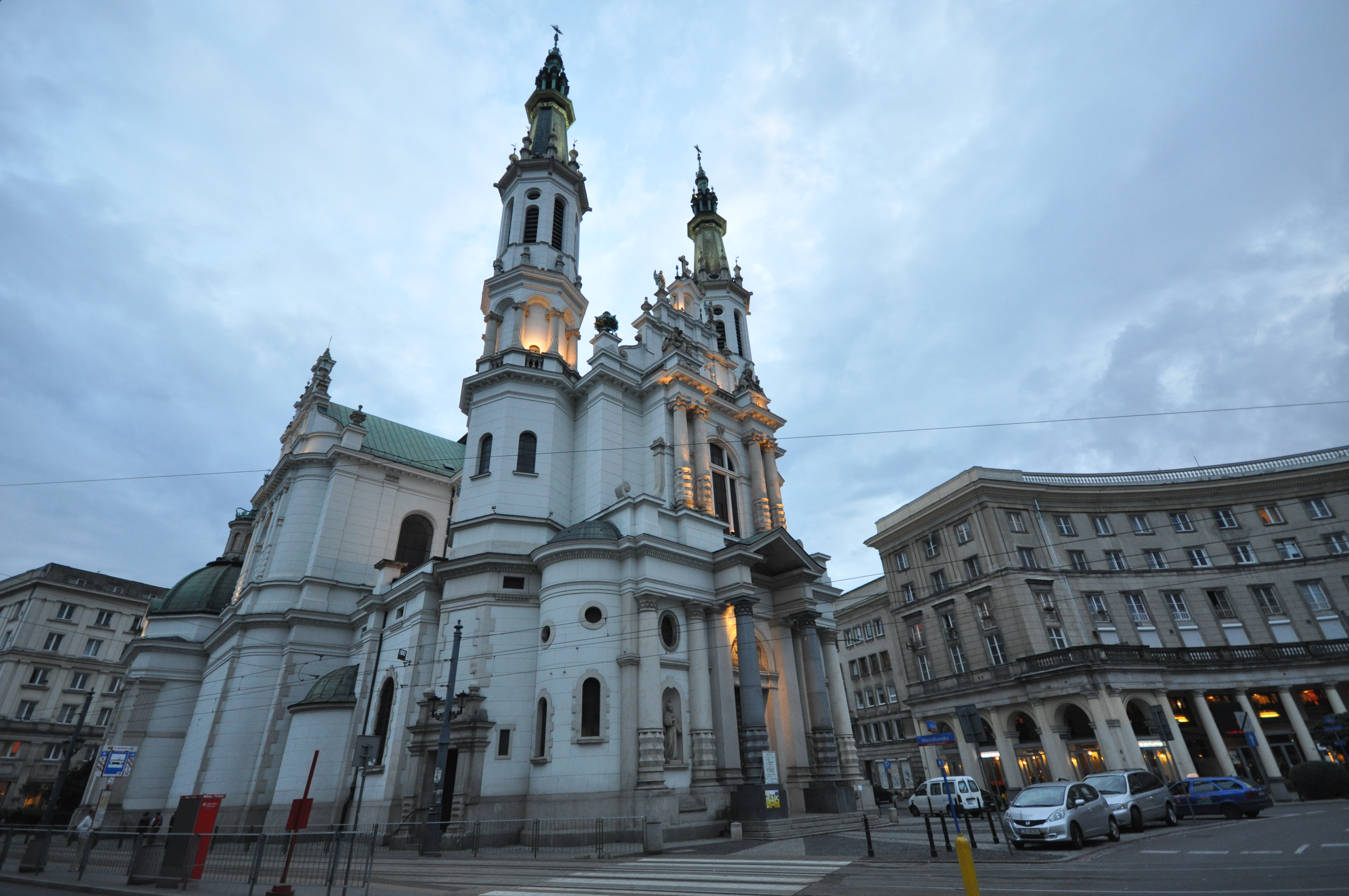
Church of the Holiest Saviour in Warsaw

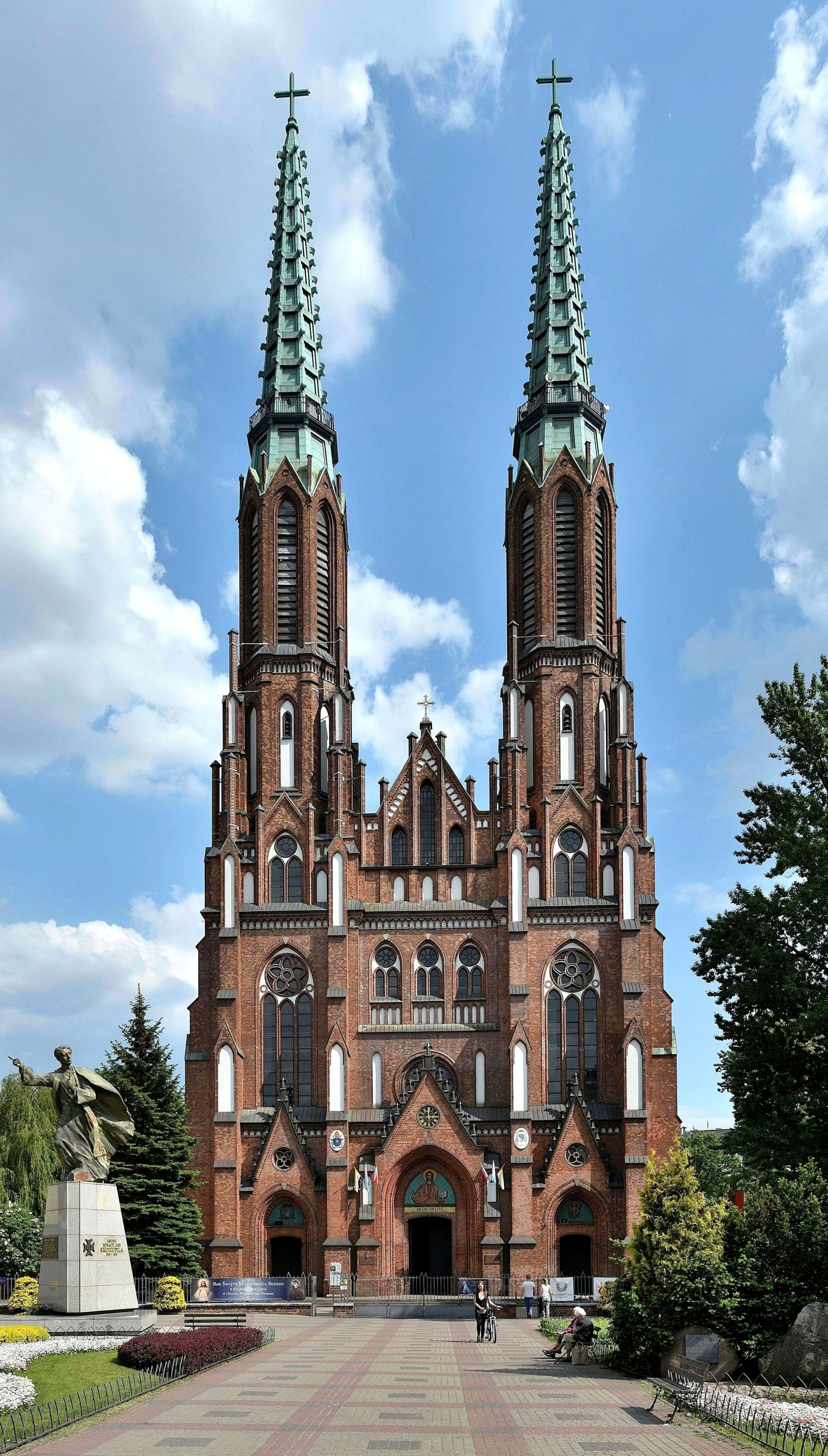
St. Florian's Cathedral in Warsaw

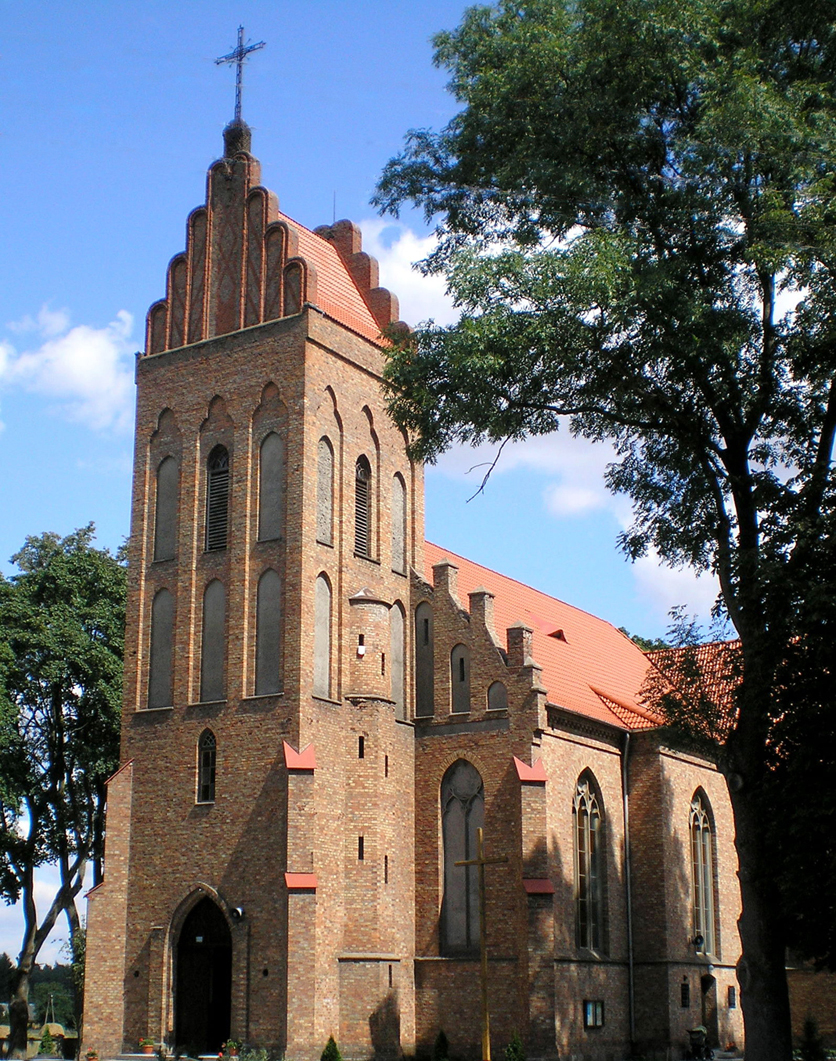
St. Nicholas Church in Sulerzyż

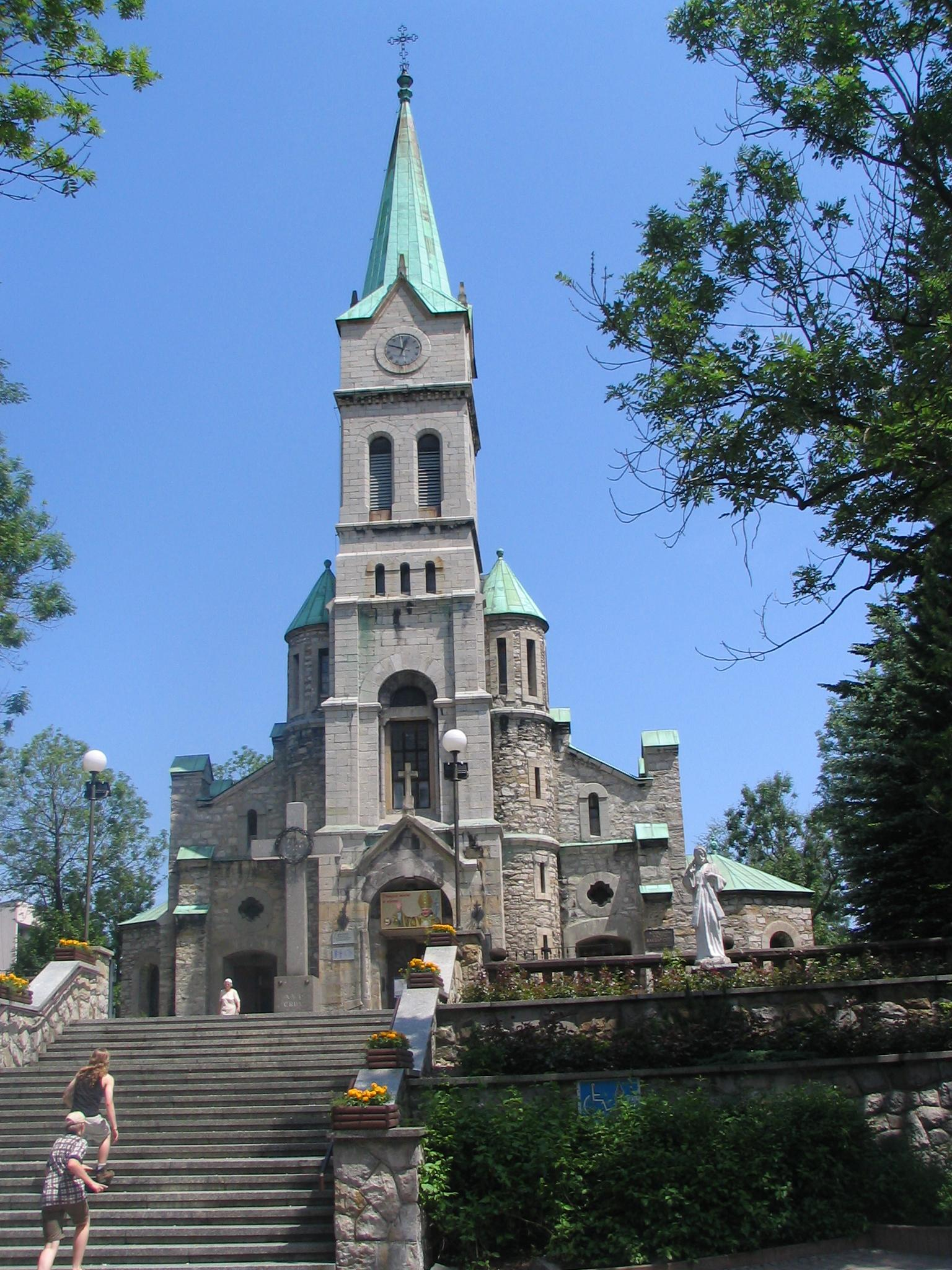
Holy Family Church in Zakopane

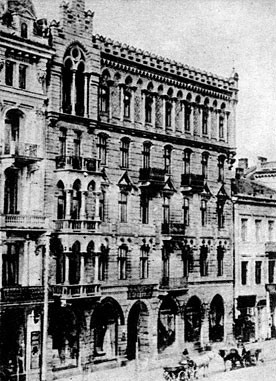
Zamboni Brothers Tenement in Warsaw

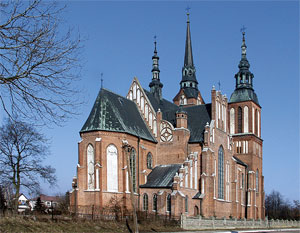
John the Baptist Church in Bielsko

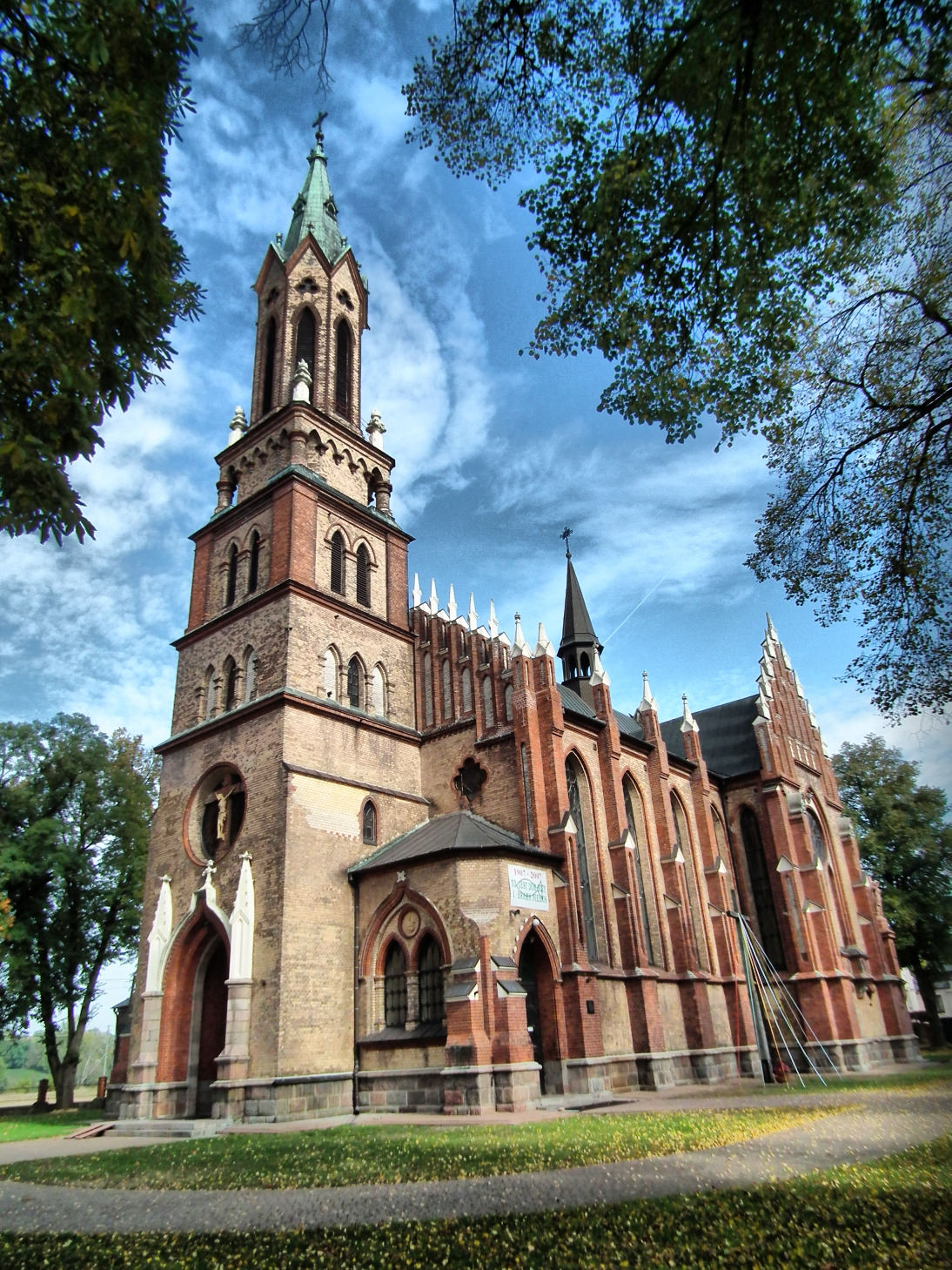
Church of the Sacred Heart of Jesus in Boby-Wieś

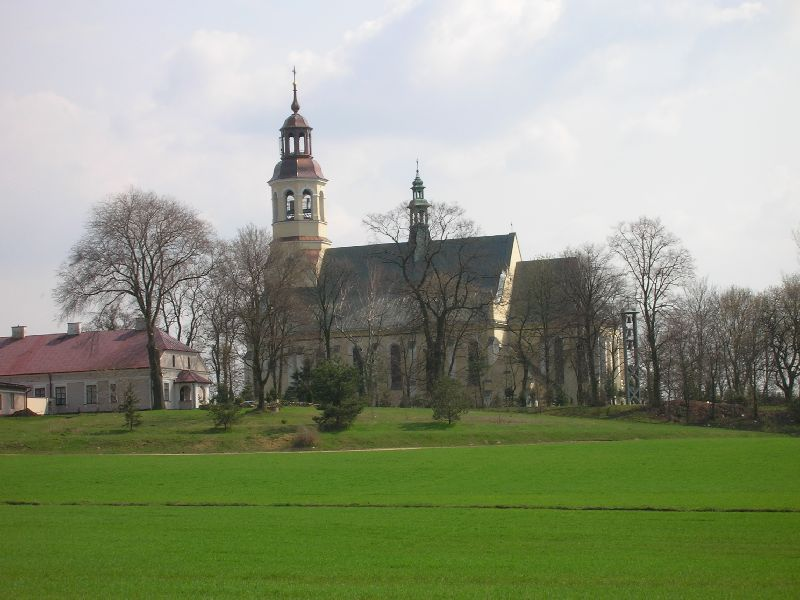
Church of Saint Bartholemew in Domaniewice

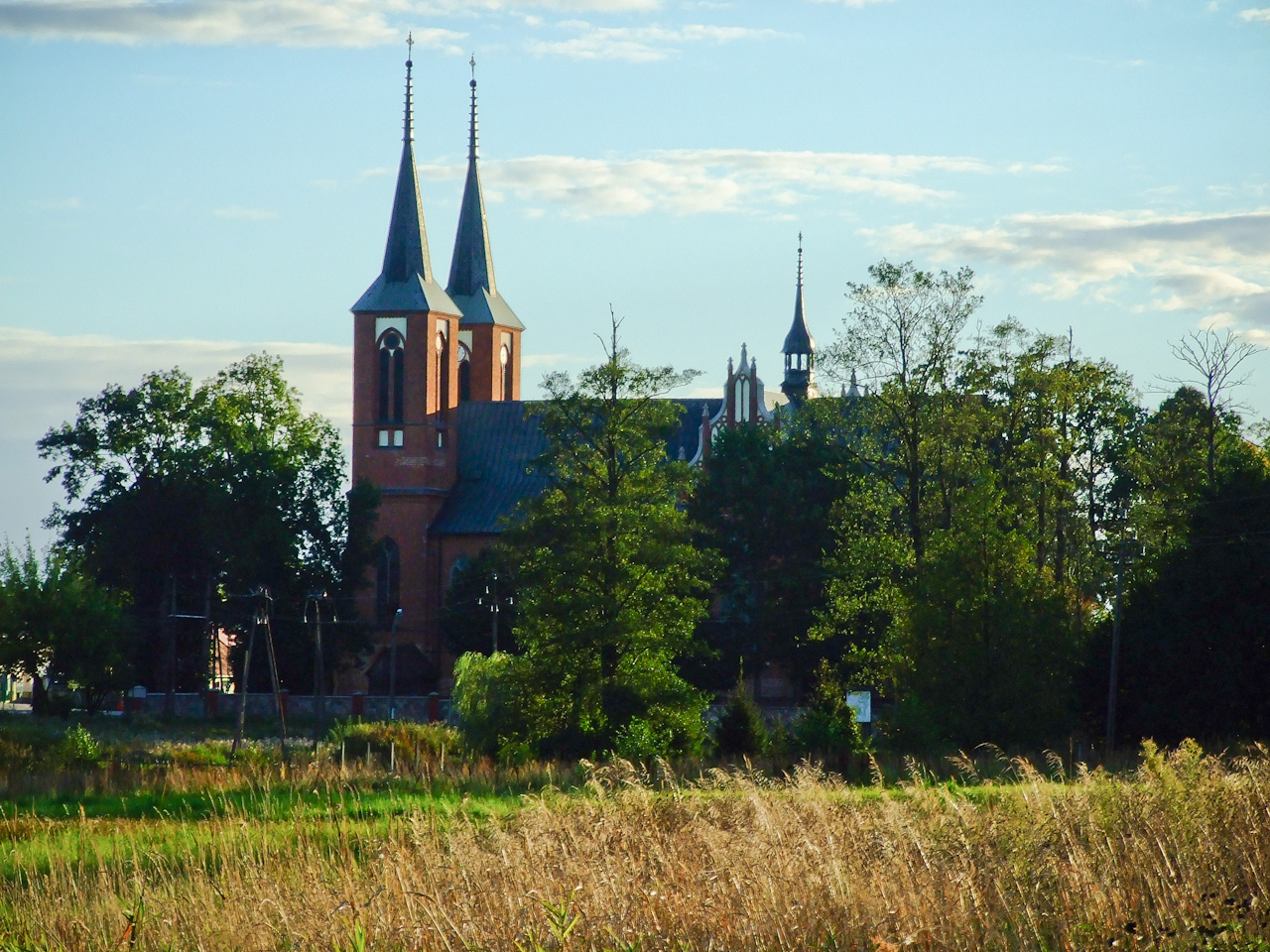
Saint Roch Church in Długosiodło

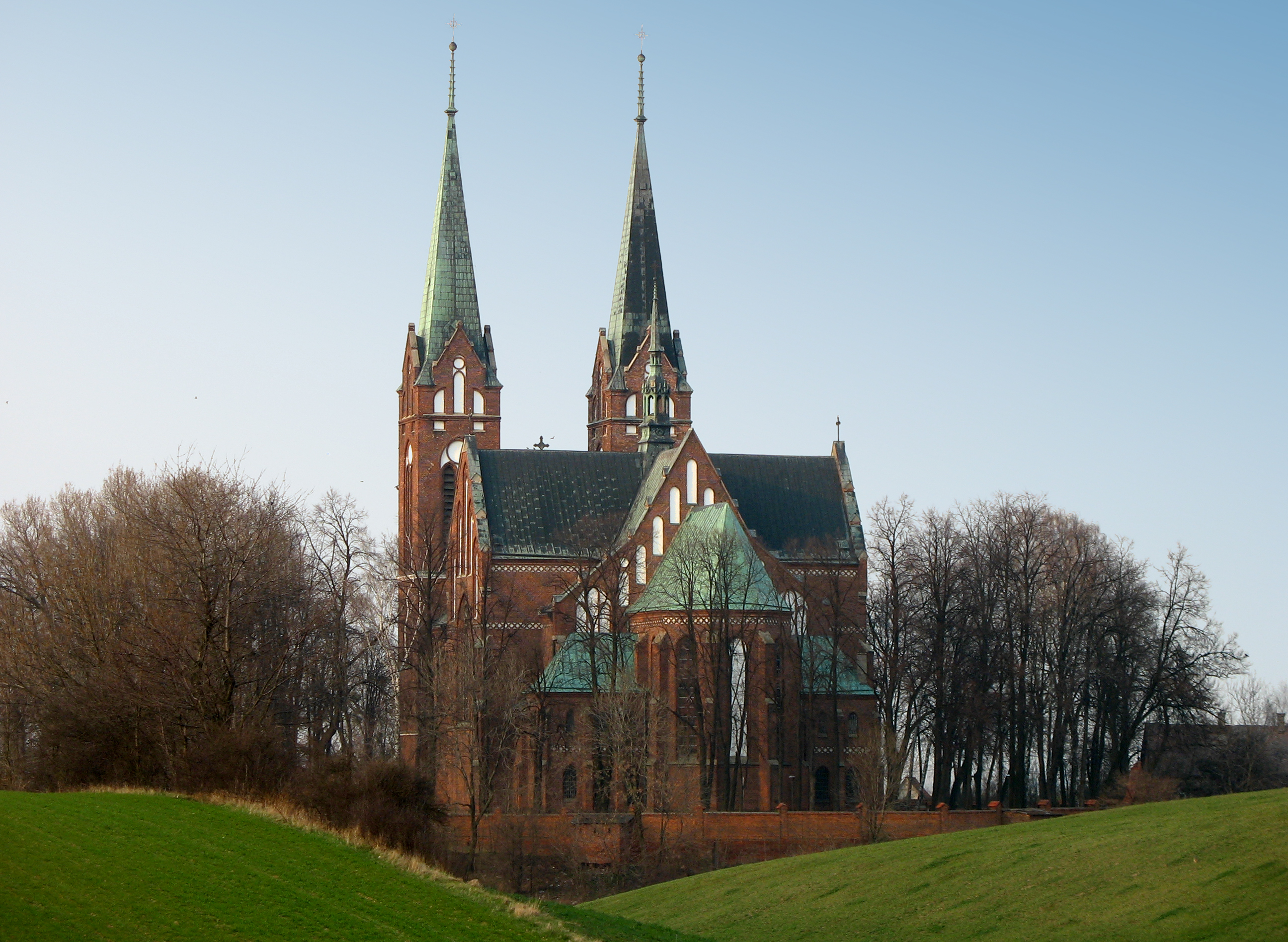
Church in Garbów

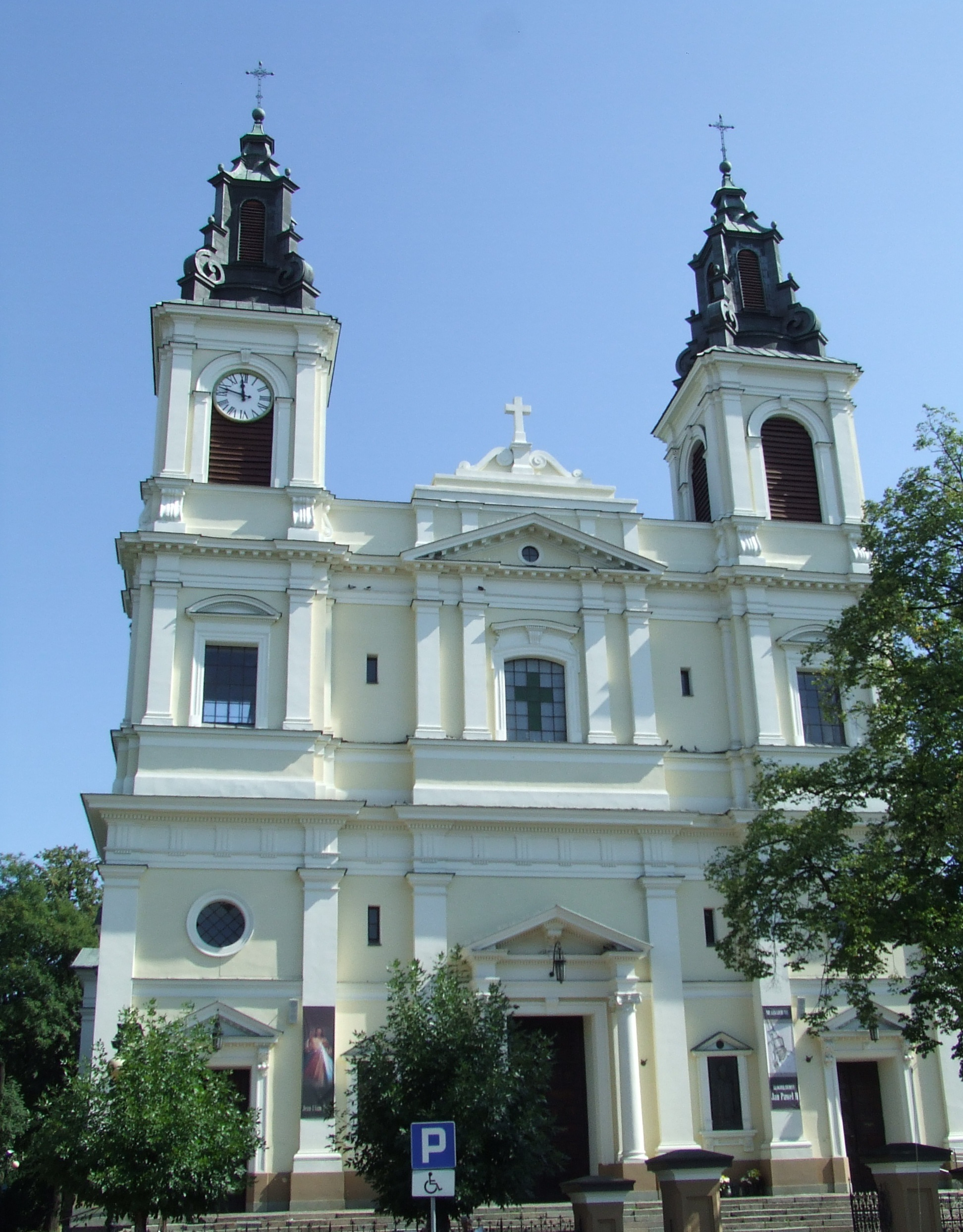
Collegiate church of Transfiguration in Garwolin

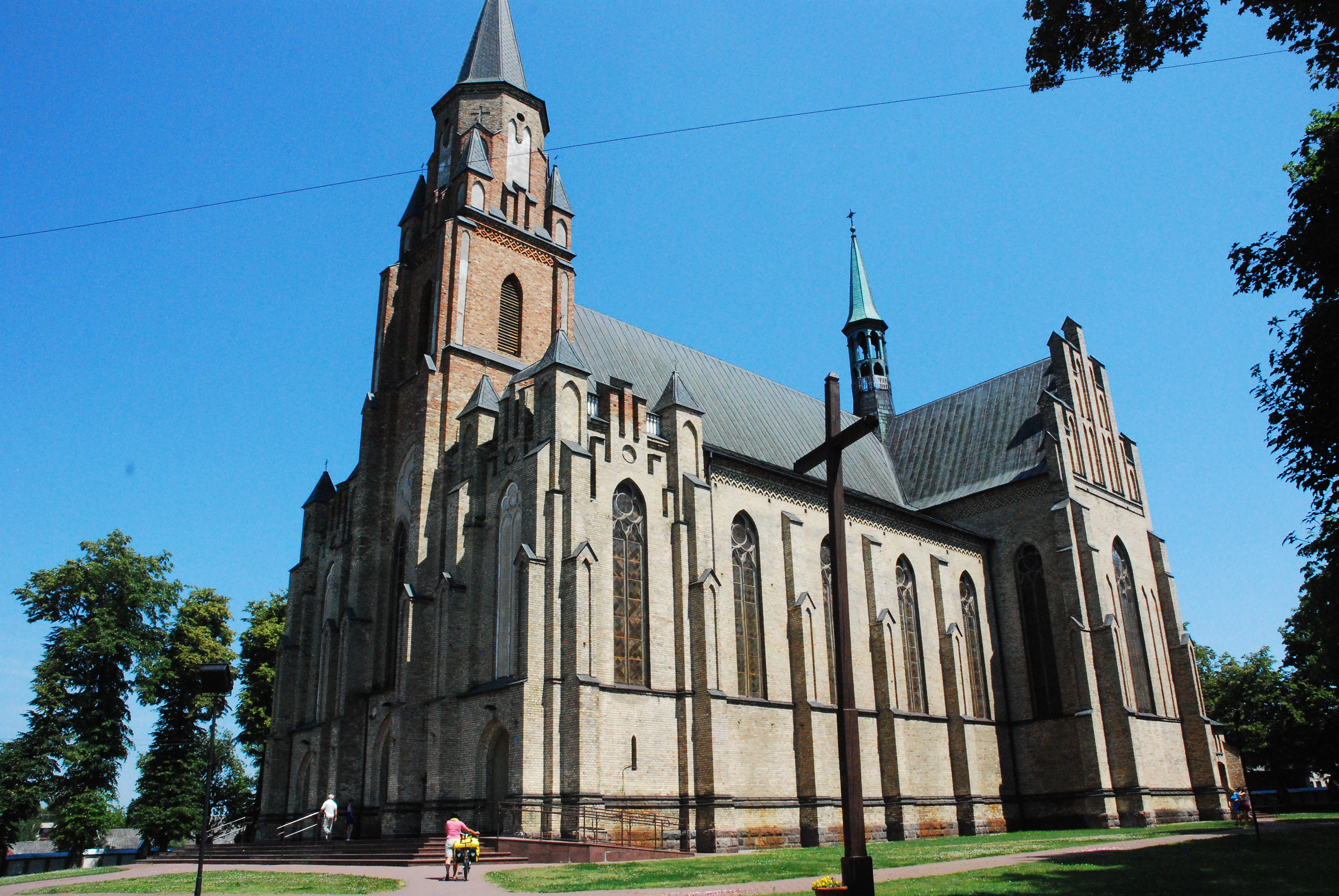
Church of the Nativity of the Virgin Mary in Kosów Lacki

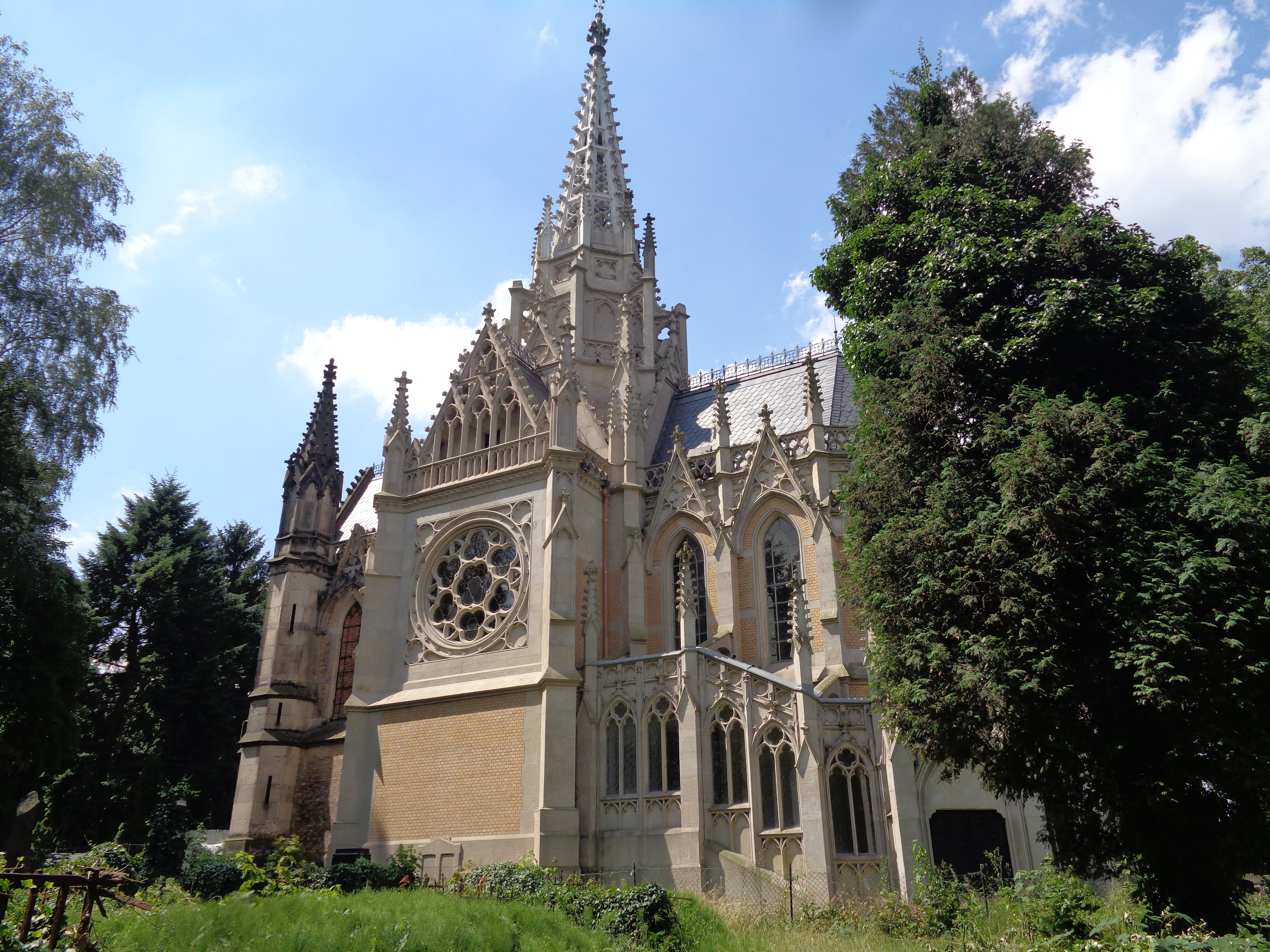
Karol Scheibler's Chapel, Łódź

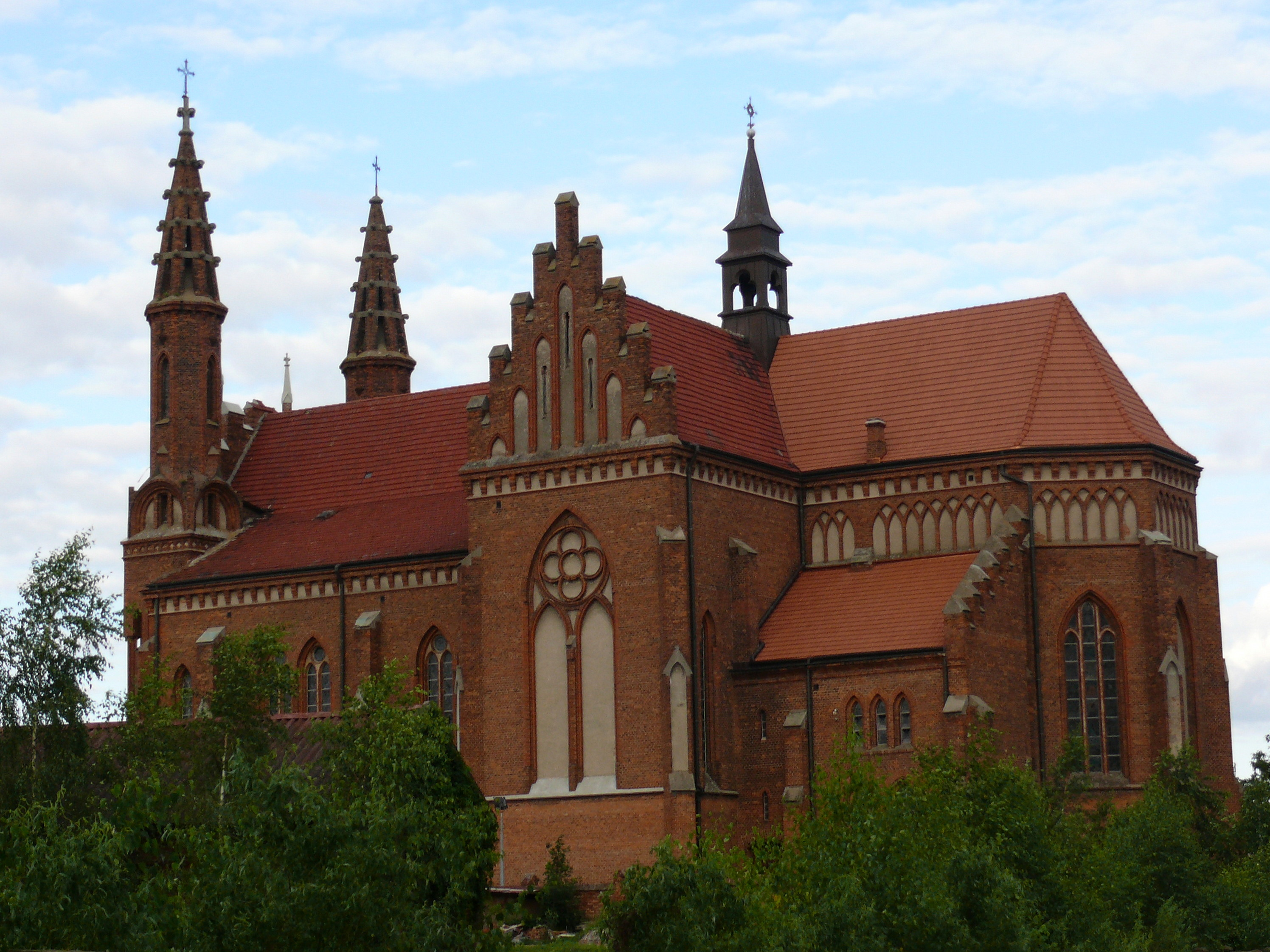
Church of the Holy Family in Przedecz

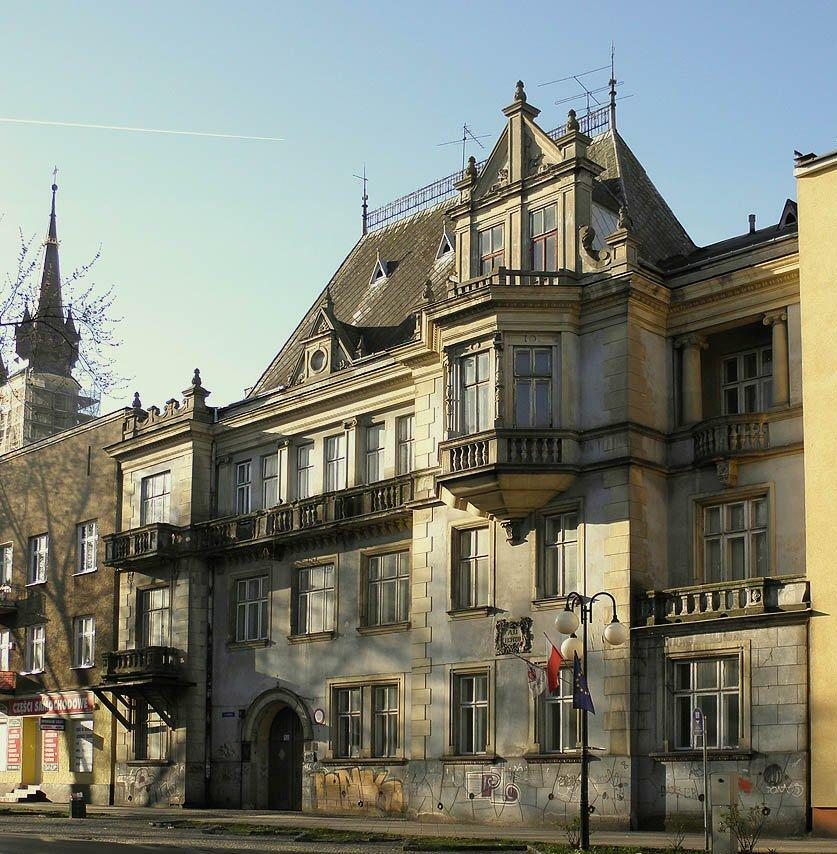
Glogiers' House in Radom

== See also ==
- Gothic Revival architecture
- Hilary Majewski
