= Scheibler Palace =

- Pałac Scheiblerów
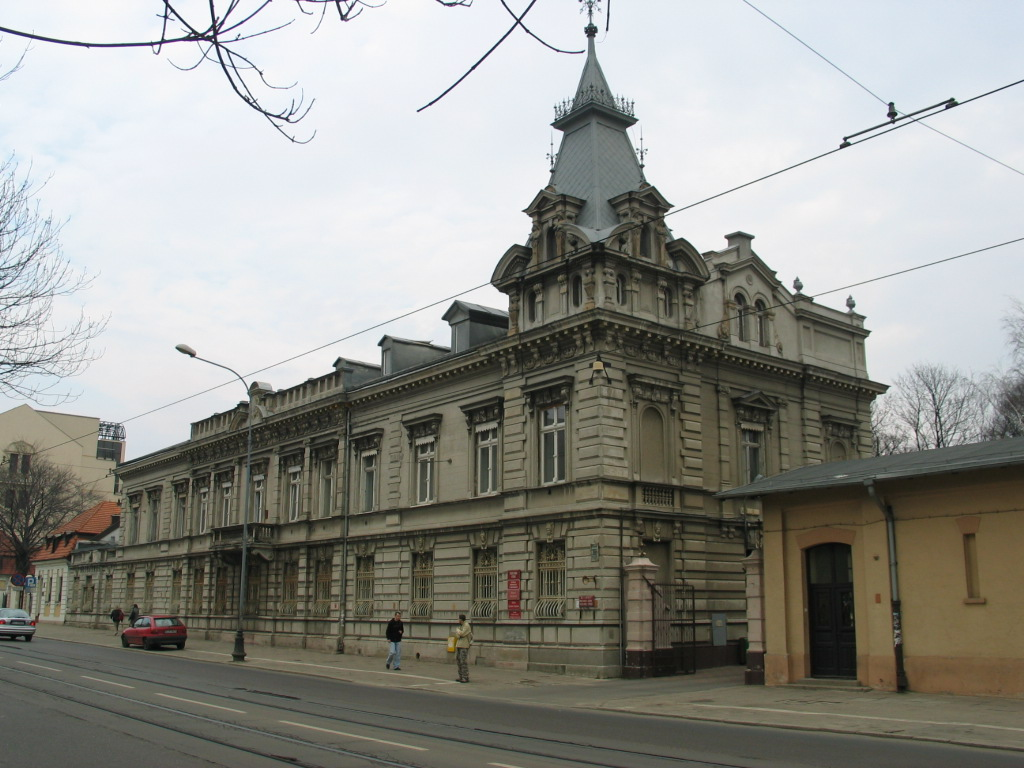

- Location within Poland

General information
- Location: 266 Piotrkowska Street, Łódź, Poland
- Coordinates: 51°44′58.08″N 19°27′39.59″E
- Construction started: 1844
- Completed: 1882
- Renovated: 1891, 1894 and 1897
- Owner: Karol Gebhardt, Leonard Fessler, Karol Scheibler (junior), Lodz University of Technology last owner

Technical details
- Floor count: 2

Design and construction
- Architects: Hilary Majewski, Franciszek Chełmiński

Scheibler Palace (Polish: Pałac Scheiblerów) located at 266, Piotrkowska Street in Łódź.

== The history of the building ==
The tenement was built in 1844 by the then proprietor–manufacturer Karl Gebhart according to the design of Louis Bethiera and Stanislaw Balinski. In the late 1840s of the 19th century the building was considered the most beautiful one in Piotrkowska Street.

An elegant building with a neoclassical elevation adorned with eight pilasters separating windows and a gable roof.

Since 1853 the proprietor of the building was a printer Leonard Fessler who lived in it for nearly thirty consecutive years. In 1880 Karol Scheibler repurchased the most elegant neoclassical residential building in Łódź for his family. Without a doubt the location of the tenement played a vital role here. It closed the west side of the Scheibler's property and was quite a landmark when looking from the main city road. It may have been initially destined for Scheibler's daughter Emma and her husband George von Kramst, but since 1886 it was inhabited by his son Karol Scheibler Jr., the heir-general to the company, whereas The Krams left Łódź and went to live in Katowice.

A year after its acquisition it became the property of Karol Scheibler's Wool Manufacture Joint Stock Company set up around that time. In 1921, however, it was excluded from the newly established Scheibler & Grohman Company and again became a private property of Karol Sheibler's heirs.

After Karol Scheibler's death the house was rebuilt in 1891. Several architects (H. Majewski, F. Chełmiński) contributed to its modern look. Over the years it was reconstructed a few times by The Scheiblers (e.g. a tower was added in the southern part), which transformed the building into a city palace of neo-Renaissance character. Its present eclectic form was the result of two subsequent alterations between 1884 and 1897. The alteration in 1894, according to the design of Franciszek Chelminski, expanded it in the southern direction by 3 more axes. In the corner, a tower topped with a tented roof in the form of a pyramid covered with scales of galvanized sheeting, was raised. The tent roof was topped with a flagpole and a flag dated 1894. 1897 saw another expansion. The palace was enlarged on the north side by a one-storey extension, housing a living room on the side facing the street and a winter garden adjoining the courtyard. The interiors were richly decorated, and stucco ceilings were covered with polychrome, which preserved to this day only in some areas. The main staircase with wooden stairs and a balustrade was decorated with fragmentarily preserved stained glass. The interiors were almost completely destroyed, but in some areas mouldings, furnaces and fireplaces are still to be seen. The layout of the interior is difficult to grasp because some actions taken by the oncoming users (e.g. former Military Study Centre of Lodz University of Technology), have contributed to the loss of its original character and function. Since 1956 the building has been used by Lodz University of Technology (TUL). Today it houses The Faculty of Organization and Management of TUL.

== See also ==
- Karol Sheibler Palace
- Schweikert Factory
