= Schweikert Factory =

- Fabryka Schweikerta
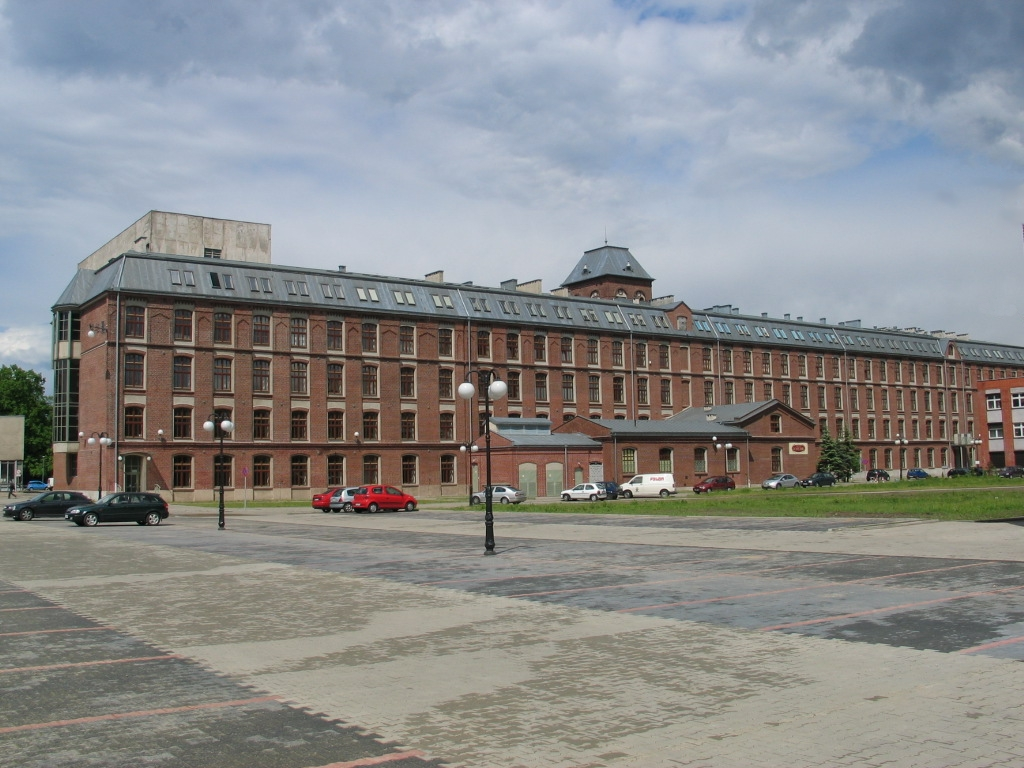
- Interactive map of the Schweikert Factory area

General information
- Location: 251 Wolczanska Street, Łódź, Poland
- Coordinates: 51°44′50″N 19°27′14″E
- Construction started: 1890
- Completed: 1893
- Owner: Fryderyk Wilhelm Schweikert, Lodz University of Technology last owner

Technical details
- Floor count: 4 + usable attic

Schweikert Factory is a former factory building belonging to the Schweikert family, located at 251 Wolczanska Street in Łódź.

== The History of the Building ==
Originally the plant produced mainly woolen scarves which were exported to Russia. Towards the end of World War II the Schweikert family decided to leave Łódź. The factory, acknowledged by authorities as post-German property, was nationalized. The production began during the war. Uniform cloth was made there for the needs of the Soviet and Polish armies. For many years after the war the factory was called Ludwik Warynski's Woolen Factory – Lodex.

At present Lodex and the majority of the remaining buildings of the former Schweikert factory have been adapted to the proper needs of Lodz University of Technology. The building is over 150 m long and covers an area of 12 thousand square metres, which makes it the biggest and longest building belonging to the University. It is currently called “Three Faculty Building ” due to the fact that it houses the department units of The Faculty of Electrical, Electronic, Computer and Control Engineering (central part), The Faculty of Technical Physics, Information Technology and Applied Mathematics (left wing), and The Faculty of Organization and Management (right wing). For historical reasons it is commonly called “Lodex” or “Tram” because of the length of the building.

== See also ==
- Robert Schweikert Palace
- Kalisz-Mazowiecki Industrial District
- Scheibler Palace
