= Karol Scheibler's Chapel =

Architectural work in Łódź, Poland

Coordinates: 51°46′35.82″N 19°25′59.85″E

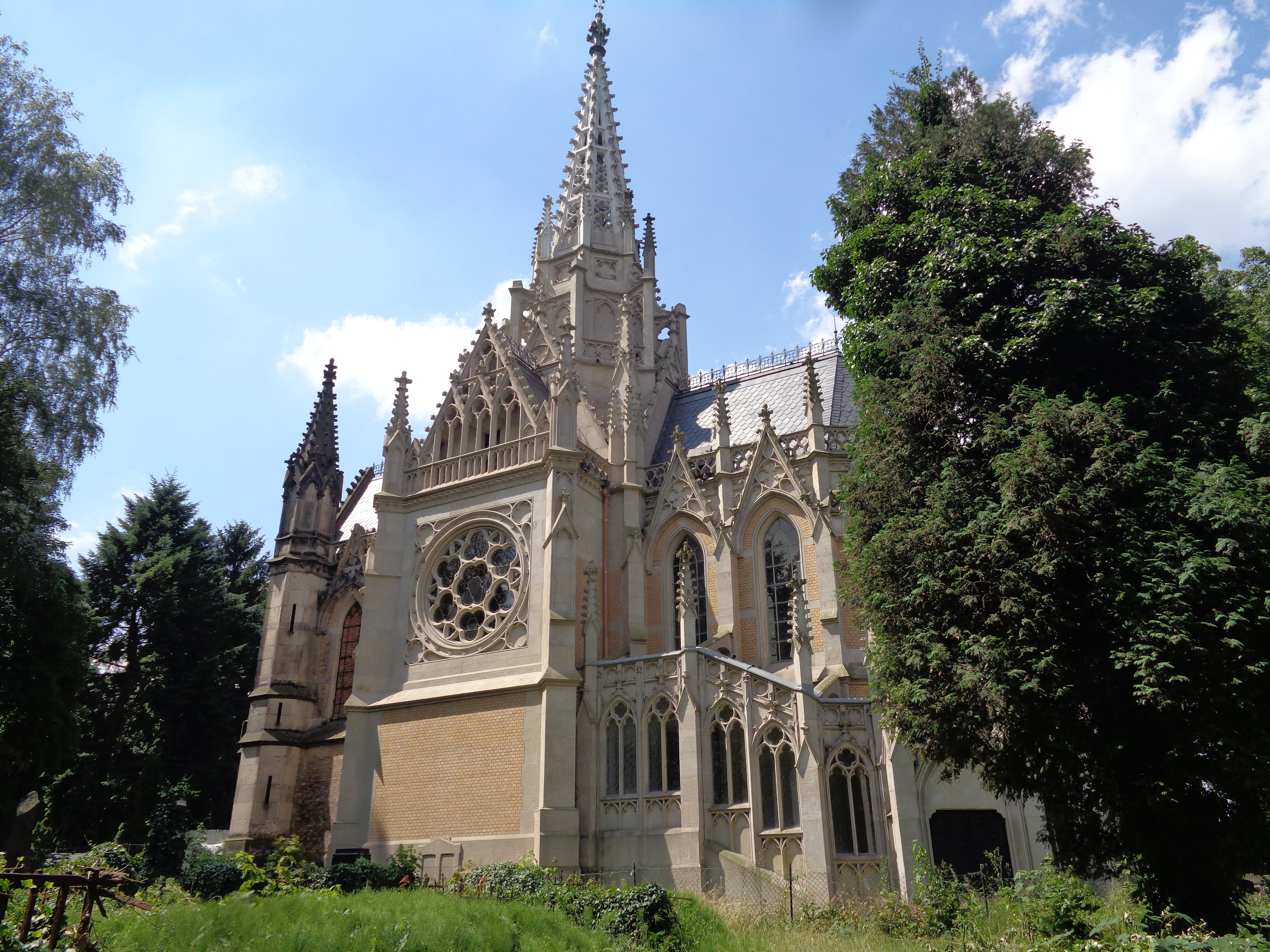
Karol Scheibler's Chapel

The Chapel of Karl Scheibler (Polish: Kaplica Karola Scheiblera), is a major architectural work in Łódź, Poland, built in 1888 and designed by architects Edward Lilpop and Józef Pius Dziekoński. It is located in the Evangelical-Augsburg part of the Old Cemetery at Ogrodowa Street 43.

Łódź is known for its architectural monuments which form a record of the city's heritage, particularly its unique nineteenth century development. The chapel and mausoleum of Karl Wilhelm Scheibler are noted examples of architecture from this period.

== Karl Scheibler ==
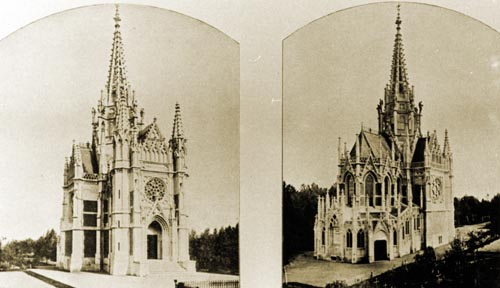
Historical images of the chapel

Karl Wilhelm Scheibler (1820–1881) was an industrial magnate who raised the profile of Łódź within Europe's textile industry. He created a large industrial empire at Priest's Mill (Księży Młyn).

While contributing heavily to the textile industry, Scheibler was also a noted philanthropist. After his death, his widow Anna Scheibler, son Karol Wilhelm, daughter Matylda and son-in-law Edward Herbst made large donations towards what would be useful to the city: schools, hospitals (such as the one on Milionowa Street, and the Children's Hospital named after Janusz Korczak), and churches (amongst them the Jesuit's Church, and the Archcathedral of Łódź).

== Architecture ==
The architecture of the building was based on French and German Gothic Revival architecture. The chapel has a slender contour, finished with openwork masonry towers and it exhibits visible influences of St. Stephen's Cathedral in Vienna and Sainte-Chapelle in Paris.

The chapel's shape and quality are recognised as in keeping with the masterpieces of Neo-Gothic architecture. The quality of the Łódź mausoleum is said to be such that there are only a handful of buildings in Europe of equal artistic quality.

== History ==
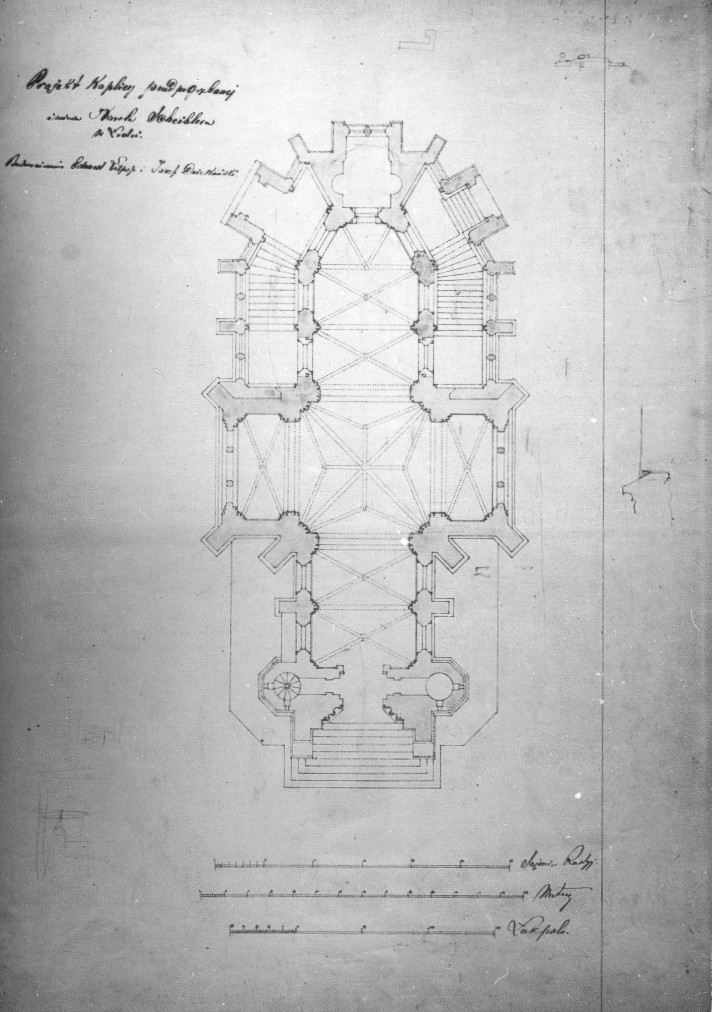
Chapel plan

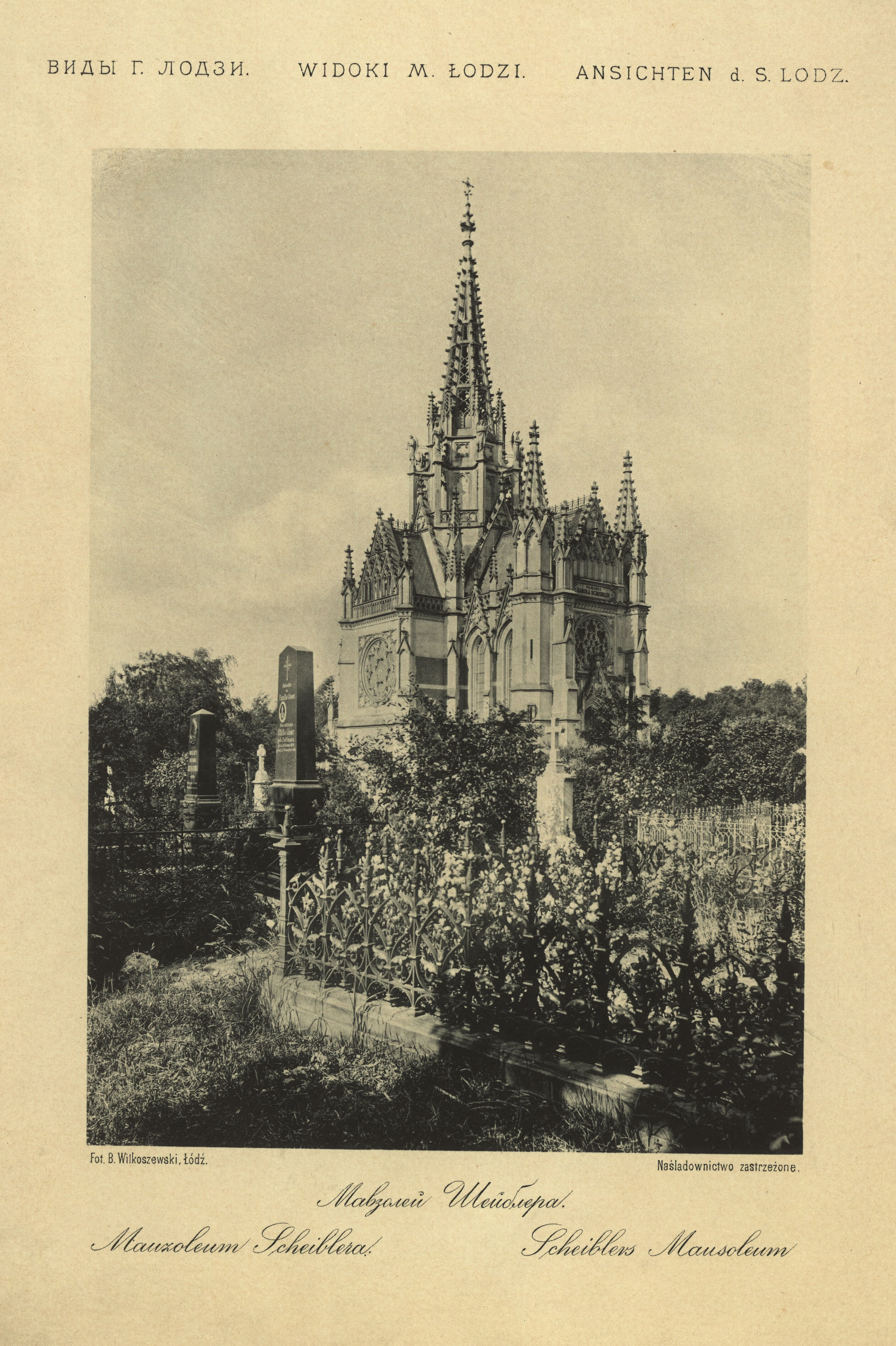
Karol Scheibler's Chapel, 1896

After his death, Anna erected the mausoleum-like chapel in his memory. It was built between 1885 and 1888 by Varsovian architects Edward Lilpop and Józef Pius Dziekoński. It was consecrated on 1 September 1888 by Lutheran pastor Wilhelm Angerstein in the presence of Karol Scheibler, his family and hundreds of inhabitants of Łódź.

Newspapers in Warsaw wrote, "the chapel is a monument executed with the greatest costs concerning our country", and "this is an uncommon work of architecture, designed with great taste and executed with unusual care."

Karol Scheibler's remains were buried in the crypt and were joined by other members of the family, including his widow, Anna Scheibler.

== After 1989 ==
After 1945, the chapel, along with the whole area of the Old Evangelical – Augsburg Cemetery, was vandalised and damaged in a series of robberies – several coffins in the crypt were destroyed. The condition of the chapel worsened considerably before the Conservatory Authority became interested in the monument in the 1970s. They executed a detailed inventory, walled up windows, and surrounded the chapel with a fence. Despite these precautions, the condition of the chapel has continued to deteriorate.

In 2009, the renovation of the chapel's tower was completed.

== See also ==
- Funerary art
- History of Łódź
