= Vasilkov uezd =

Vasilkov uezd Васильковский уезд
- Uezd
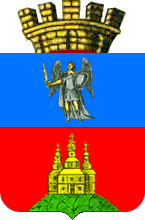
- Coat of arms

- Location in the Kiev Governorate
- Country: Russian Empire
- Krai: Southwestern
- Governorate: Kiev
- Established: 1802
- Abolished: 1923
- Capital: Vasilkov

Area
  - Total: 4,132.3 km^{2} (1,595.5 sq mi)

Population (1897)
  - Total: 315,823
  - Density: 76.428/km^{2} (197.95/sq mi)

The Vasilkov uezd (Russian: Васильковский уезд; Ukrainian: Василківський повіт, romanized: Vasylkivs'kyi povit) was one of the subdivisions of the Kiev Governorate of the Russian Empire. It was situated in the central part of the governorate. Its administrative centre was Vasilkov (Vasylkiv).

== Demographics ==
At the time of the Russian Empire Census of 1897, Vasilkovsky Uyezd had a population of 315,823. Of these, 83.6% spoke Ukrainian, 12.1% Yiddish, 2.2% Russian, 1.8% Polish, 0.1% Tatar and 0.1% German as their native language.

In July 1919, the center of the Vasylkiv district was transferred to Bila Tserkva. The latter was granted the status of a city, and the county was renamed Bila Tserkva. The entire internal division remained unchanged. As a result, the first freelance city since 1846, Vasylkiv, appeared in the Kyiv province.

On March 7, 1923, the district was liquidated, and its territory became part of the Bila Tserkva, Velykopolovets, Hrebinkiv, Kozhany, Rokytnyany, Uzyn, Fastiv districts of the Bila Tserkva district and the Vasylkiv district of the Kyiv district.
