= Karl Wilhelm Scheibler =

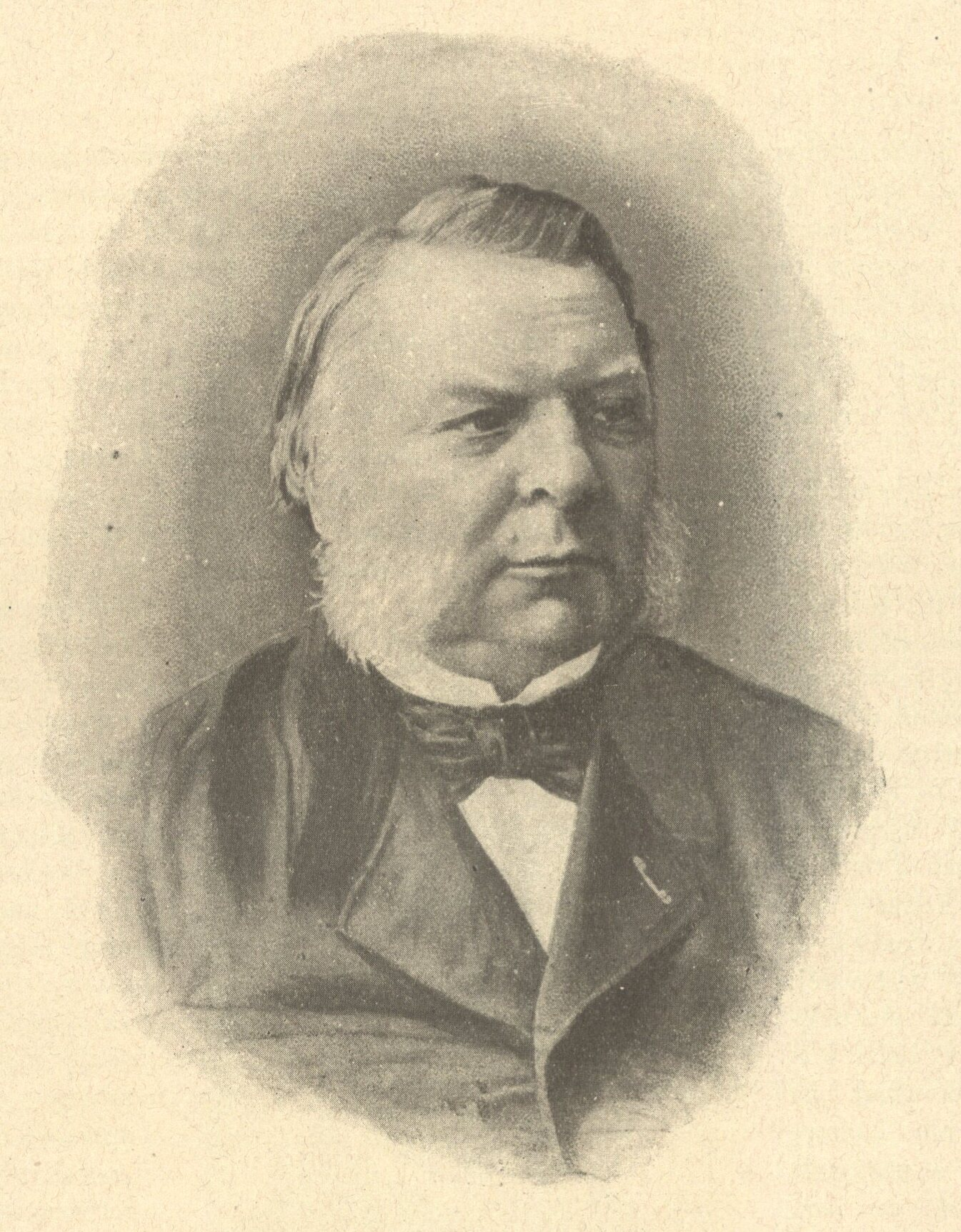
- Karl Wilhelm Scheibler
- Born: 1 September 1820; Monschau, Prussia
- Died: 13 April 1881 (aged 60); Łódź, Congress Poland
- Occupations: Industrialist, textile magnate

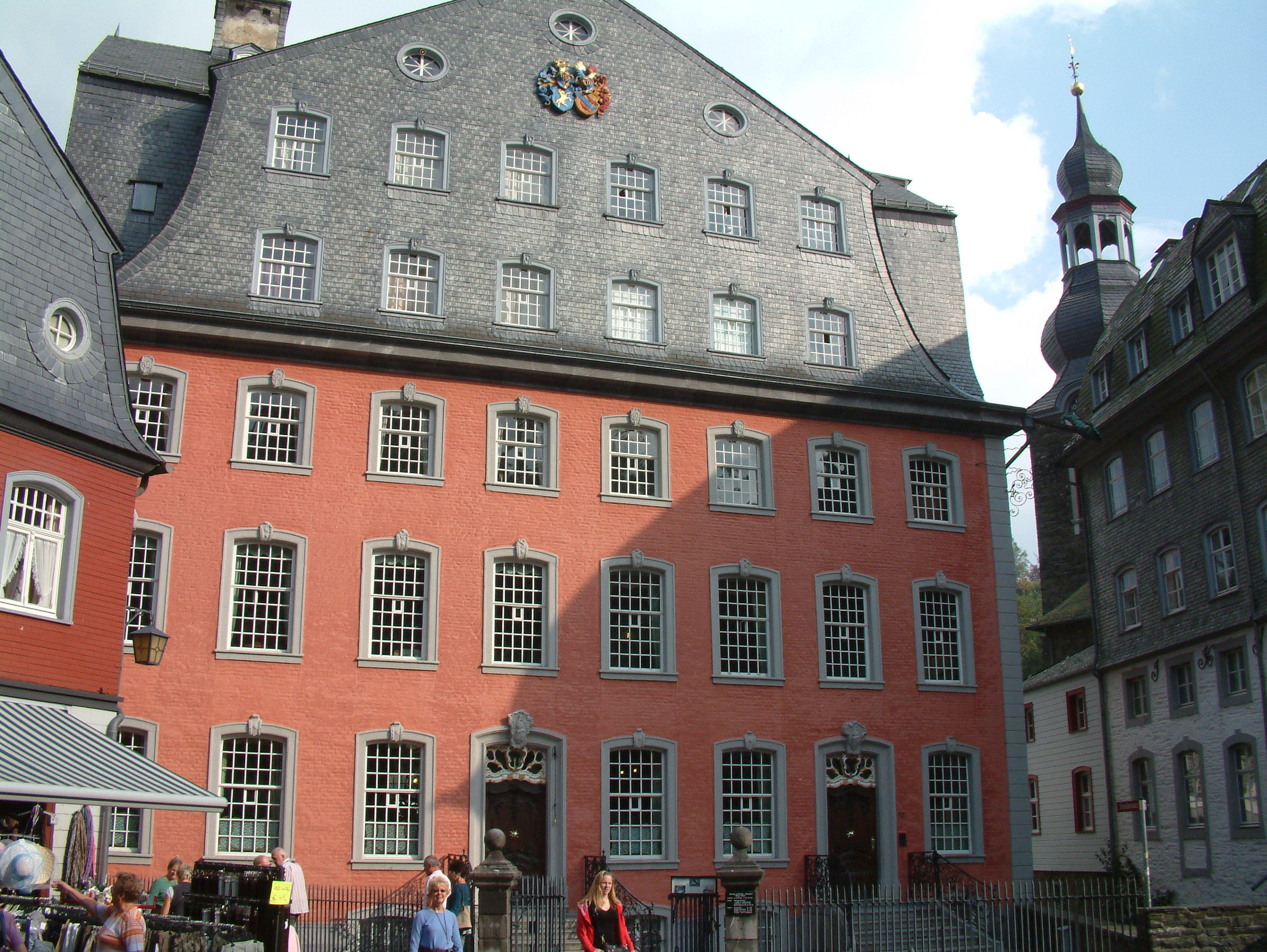
The "Red House" of Monschau, ancestral home of the Scheibler family

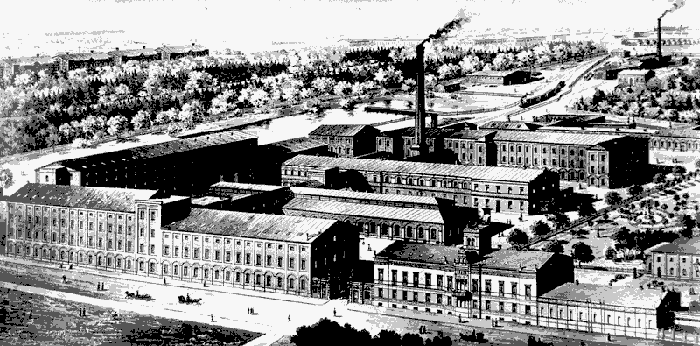
Scheibler's factory at Łódź

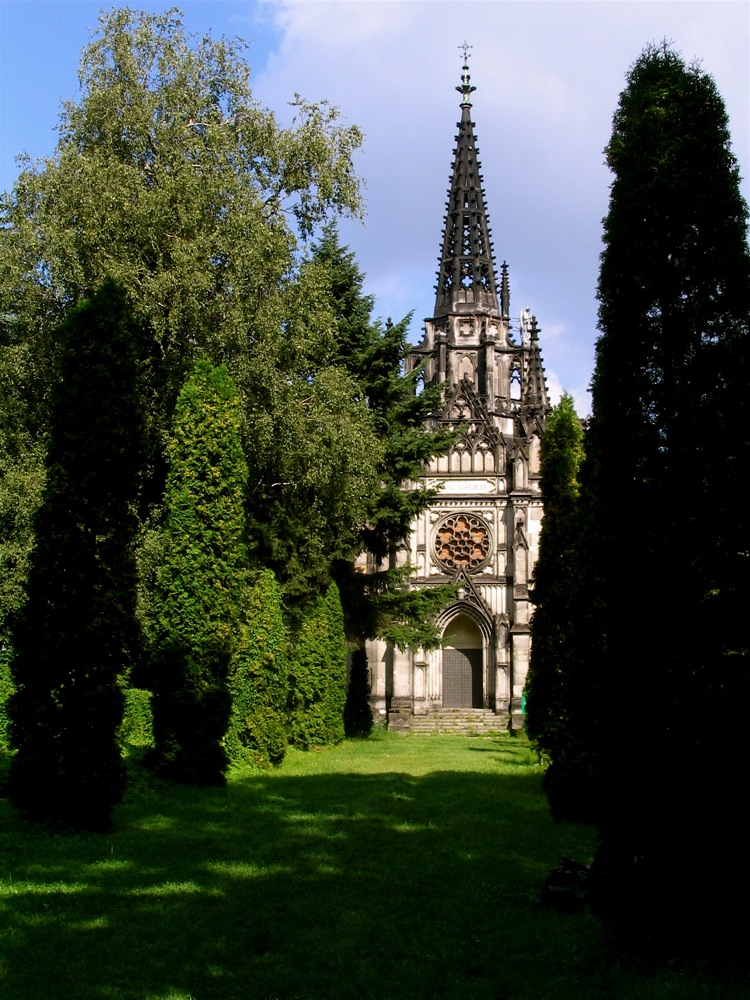
Scheibler's Mausoleum at the Protestant Cemetery of Łódź

Karl Wilhelm Scheibler (Polish: Karol Scheibler, 1 September 1820 – 13 April 1881) was a German-born Polish industrialist, businessman and textile manufacturer.

== Biography ==
Scheibler was born in Montjoie (today Monschau) in the Prussian Province of Jülich-Cleves-Berg into a family of textile fabricants. He attended school in Monschau and Krefeld and received a practical education at his uncle's Worsted factory at Verviers (Belgium). In 1839, he worked for Société anonyme John Cockerill, a well known producer of machinery construction at that time.

Because of the riots of the Spring of Nations in 1848 Scheibler decided to leave Germany and moved to Ozorkow in Congress Poland, where his uncle, Friedrich Schlösser, had operated a textile factory since 1816. After Schlösser's death he became its commercial director. Scheibler married Anna née Werner, a niece of Schlösser, on 16 September 1854. In 1852, Scheibler and his partner Julius Schwartz bought a plot at Łódź and started to build a machinery factory. In October 1854, Schwartz sold his share to Scheibler for 10,000 rubles, making him the sole owner of the factory.

In 1855, Scheibler founded a spinning mill with 34 frames and a steam engine of 40 horsepower. In 1857, Scheibler employed 180 labourers and earned a turnover of 305,100 rubles in 1860. Scheibler made large profits after cotton prices in Europe increased because of the American Civil War and sold his stock at triple the price. He became known as the "King of the Cotton and Linen Empires of Łódź". In 1870, 1,911 employees worked in his factory, which was the third largest (9.3 percent) cotton producer of Poland.

Scheibler's factory continued to prosper and he bought several smaller mills in the districts of Źarki and Księży Młyn. After a fire destroyed the factory at Księży Młyn in 1874, Scheibler rebuilt it with 88.000 spindles and built his own "Kingdom" of Księży Młyn with houses for 321 families, a fire station, schools, shops and a hospital Scheibler was known for his social engagement and supported the foundation of a municipal credit association, the Commercial Bank of Łódź (Bank Handlowy) in 1872 as well as the construction of a Lutheran and a Catholic Church.

In 1880, he transformed his enterprise into a stock corporation with a share capital of 9 million Ruble.

Scheibler died on 13 April 1881 in Łódź and was buried at the Protestant Cemetery of Łódź in a mausoleum designed by the Warsaw architects Joseph Dziekonski and Edward Lilop.

== Awards ==
- 1870 Order of the White Eagle
- 1876 Gold Medal in Warsaw
- 1878 Great Gold Medal at the Paris World's Fair
- Order of Saint Stanislaus First and Second class

== Cultural associations ==
Andrzej Wajda's movie The Promised Land was filmed inside Scheibler's Palace, which is today the location of the Cinematographic Museum of the National Film School in Łódź.

The figure of the German industrialist Heinz Huntze, a character of The Brothers Ashkenazi, is loosely based on Karl Wilhelm Scheibler.
