= History of Łódź =

The flag of Łódź

Łódź is located in central Poland and is the fourth-largest city in the country. For hundreds of years it was a small town, before the first quarter of the 19th century when there was a massive industrialization program and transformation of the town to a large industrial center.

== 15th to 19th century ==
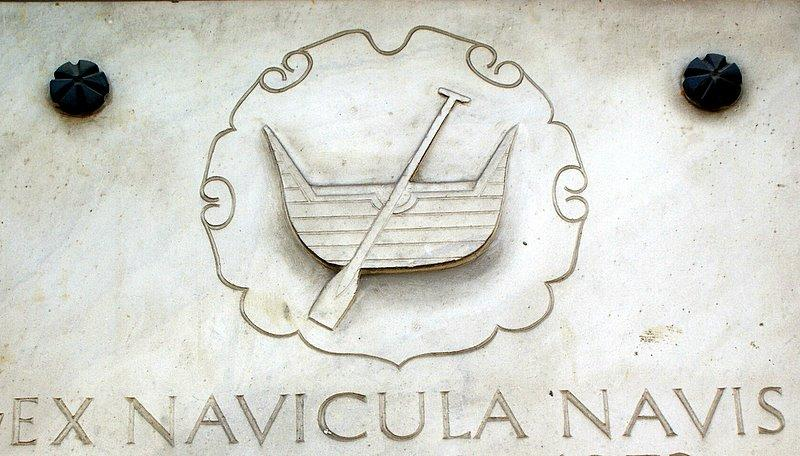
Ex Navicula Navis, Łódź motto

Łódź itself, called Łódka, existed already in the 12th century, but the first records of this agricultural settlement date back to 1332. It was first a prince's village, but then it came under the control of the Włocławek bishops. It happened in 1332 based on the decision of Władysław the Hunchback, Duke of Łęczyca.

On July 1423 King Władysław II Jagiełło awarded Łódź with city rights. Up to that point it was a village under the ownership of Kujawy Bishop. The term 'city' applies to the legal/administrative status of the local authority and not to the number of residents. For hundreds of years Łódź remained a small town consisting of no more than 1,000 people.

The market square was probably marked out in 1414 during the founding of the city on the initiative of the Włocławek bishops. In 1423, when granting municipal rights, King Władysław II Jagiełło authorized the "weekly market every Wednesday and yearly twice a year". A wooden town hall was built on the market square, later destroyed in unknown circumstances. Another one, created in 1585, survived until the 18th century. The market was re-regulated in 1821 and gradually built up with tenements.

At the beginning of the 15th century there were fifteen villages in today's boundaries of Łódź. There were forests around. As majority of the then small commercial and agricultural towns, it was a market and an inn for a dozen or so neighboring villages. Also, like most cities in central Poland, it never had walls or and was an open city.

In 1561, the residents of Łódź obtained a construction permit for the town hall, but it was not until 1585 that a contract was concluded with the townsman Michał Doczkałowicz for its construction. He fulfilled his promise and erected a wooden building, for which he obtained the right to use one of the rooms as an inn.

The settlement of Łódź was at the Piotrków route towards Piotrków Trybunalski and served the customs chamber on the Ostroga River. This chamber belonged to the king, but it was rented by the archbishop of Gniezno. However, he allowed all customs duties to be collected by the bishop of Włocławek and he was supposed to pay the lease to the king.

It is near this settlement that the oldest parish of the Assumption of the Blessed Virgin Mary was created in Łódź. Its origins date back to the fourteenth century. It is believed that it was erected between 1364 and 1371 by the Archbishop of Gniezno Jarosław Bogoria Skotnicki and until 1885 it was the only parish in Łódź. Such villages, which later became districts incorporated to the city, such as Bałuty, Doły or Radogoszcz belonged to it. The first priest of this parish was Father Piotr Śliwka.

The brick church standing on Church Square is the third temple in this place. The first of the wooden churches was built in the fourteenth century, when the parish was established. The second, three times the size of the old one was built between 1765 and 1768. This was done at the behest of Włocławek's bishop Antoni Ostrowski.

Almost opposite the settlement of Lodz, around 1410 the village of Ostroga was established. It was on the right side of the Ostroga River, which was later called the Łódka and was opposite to the settlement of Lodz.

During the 16th century, around 700 people lived in Łódź. New houses were built around the Old Market Square. A street called Nad Rzeką was coming out of it. Then they began to be called Nadrzeczna, later Podrzeczna, and finally Drewnowska, apparently, the latter name was given to the influential Drewnowicz family from Łódź.

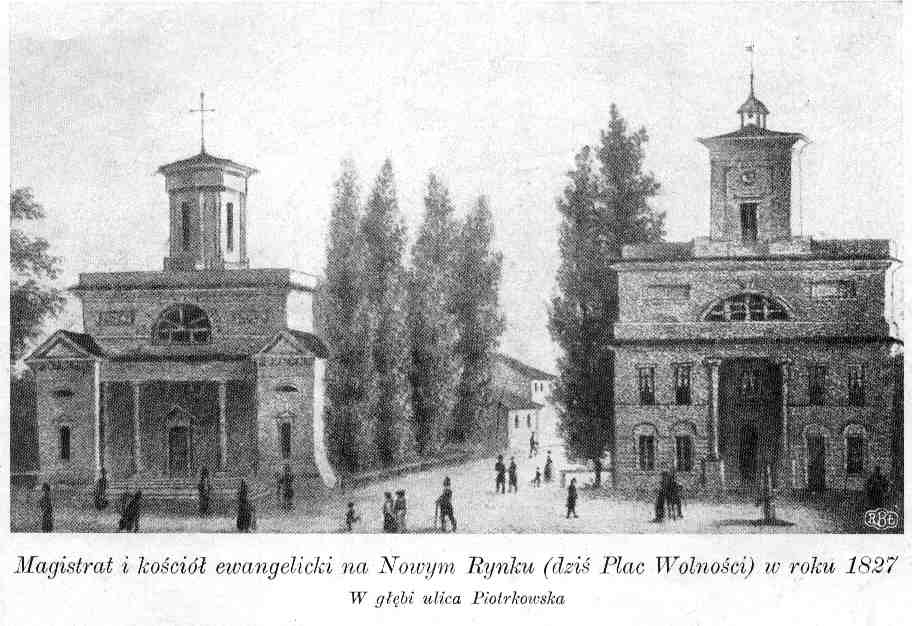
Plac Wolności (Liberty Square), early 19th century

The 17th and 18th centuries were a turbulent period in the history of Poland, and also the time of the fall of Łódź. Wars, and especially the Swedish Deluge of 1655 destroyed the city very seriously. The Swedes burned 25 houses and murdered some of the townspeople. In 1661, a fire and plague passed through the city. At the end of the 17th century, the city rebuilt slightly and had 64 houses.

During the reign of King Stanisław Poniatowski, the bishop of Włocławek gave the inhabitants of Łódź the last privilege, i.e. he abolished his eternal duties and established rent in money as the only form of benefits for the owner. However, this reform did not manage to enter into force. Following the Second Partition of Poland, the town was annexed by Prussia in 1793. The Prussians took the goods from the bishops. end of the 18th century the town had only 190 inhabitants and only 44 houses, all buildings were wooden, no road was paved.

== Modern period ==
In the second decade of the 19th century, the area of its urban development, later the Old Town, was small and amounted to 20 ha. The urban layout has retained the typical features of the medieval layout until then. It was characterized by a network of narrow streets, leaving slightly obliquely from the Market Square and enclosing buildings in small, irregular blocks. The central part of the layout was marked by a market square, separated by an inter-market block from the square where the church stood. The whole town development was limited to housing these squares and the initial sections of eight streets, some of which crossed the road to nearby cities and took their names from them. Dense building development occurred only at the Market Square and along the market streets: Drewnowska, Podrzeczna, Nadstawna and Kościelna (known until the end of the first half of the 19th century as Piotrkowska).

=== Becoming an industrial city ===
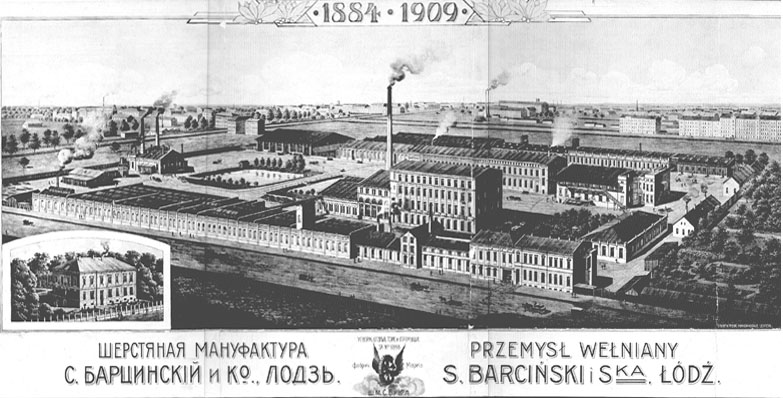
Salomon Barciński Factory on Tylna Street

In the 1815 treaty, it was planned to renew the dilapidated town and with the 1816 decree, issued by the Czar, a number of German immigrants received territory deeds for them to clear the land and to build factories and housing. Their incentives for settlement included "exemption from tax obligations for a period of six years, free materials to build houses, perpetual lease of land for construction, exemption from military service or duty-free transport of the immigrants' livestock." In 1820 Stanisław Staszic aided in changing the small town into a modern industrial centre.

In the vicinity of Łódź there was no possibility of developing mining and metallurgy, for that favorable geographical and political conditions of development were mentioned above industry, which is why the authorities decided to create a textile industry. At that time, abolition of the customs border between Congress Poland and the Russian Empire provided a very important economic and political stimulus for the development of the textile industry in Poland and the huge opportunities associated with it.

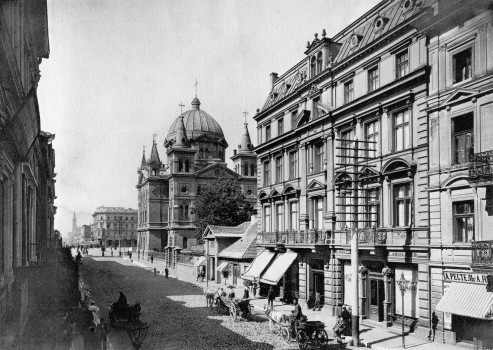
Piotrkowska Street in 1896

It was decided that the "New Town", be located south of the existing "Old Town", at the opposite side of the Łódka river. The main reason was the land there belonged to the government. The new industrial Łódź created at that time was not a simple continuation of the feudal town. It was not created through an evolutionary process or by a gradual reconstruction of the medieval layout design for new industrial needs. On the contrary, it was a deliberate idea to create it outside this area, in the so-called "Raw root". Rajmund Rembieliński in 1820 personally designated a place on the market for the new settlement and defined the direction of future streets. He chose the top of the local hill through which he went along the Piotrków route along which several local roads converged. The new settlement had been assumed to be separate, though officially still a part of an existing city, therefore it was necessary to keep it as well integrated as possible, which was best done by the new Piotrków route, connecting the areas on both sides of the river by the shortest line.

Polish insurgents operated in and around Łódź during the January Uprising of 1863–1864. At the beginning of the uprising, on January 31, 1863, a unit of 300 insurgents entered the city without a fight and seized weapons and funds for the uprising. In April 1863 the insurgents attacked a transport of prisoners of war captured by the Russians and liberated them. Further clashes between Polish insurgents and Russian troops took place in Łódź on June 18 and September 29, 1863.

In 1899, brothers Władysław and Antoni Krzemiński from the Polish noble family of Krzemiński of Prus III coat of arms founded the first stationary scinema in Poland (Gabinet Iluzji) at Piotrkowska Street. In 1899 Józef Piłsudski, the future Polish leader during World War I and the interwar period, and his wife Maria Piłsudska settled in Łódź. They edited and printed underground Polish press in the city, for which they were arrested by the Okhrana in 1900, and then imprisoned in the Warsaw Citadel.

The Łódź Insurrection occurred in 1905. Several years later, in 1913, labor strikes again occurred in Łódź. Hundreds of workers joined strikes at cotton mills in the city, resulting in mill closures.

Despite the impending crisis preceding World War I, Łódź grew exponentially and was one of the world's most densely populated industrial cities, with a population density of 13,200 inhabitants per square kilometre (34,000/sq mi) by 1914. In the aftermath of the Battle of Łódź (1914), the city came under Imperial German occupation on 6 December. With Polish independence restored in November 1918, the local population disarmed the German army. Subsequently, the textile industry of Łódź stalled and its population briefly decreased as ethnic Germans left the city.

=== Second Polish Republic ===
In the interbellum Poland it was the capital of the Łódź Voivodeship. The city continued to develop. The sewage trewatment works station was built in 1928 at 1 Zamiejska street and began operate in December 1930 (it operated until 1996 and was demolished few years later).

=== Second World War ===
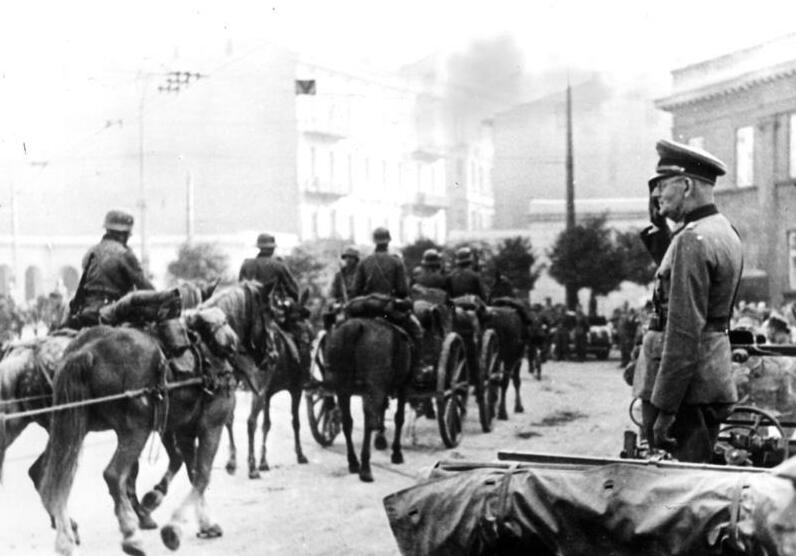
German soldiers entering Łódź during the invasion of Poland, September 1939

At the very beginning of the war, Łódź was a target of German aggression. The first German bombs fell in the area of Kaliska Railway Station and at Lublinek Airport outside the city. During the first week of occupation, economic life in Łódź came to a halt. German Luftwaffe raids completely disrupted the work of shops, offices, and various other institutions. Polish Air Force and anti-aircraft artillery, which were insufficient in quantity and strength, were not able to effectively counteract the brutal attacks of the enemy. Already on September 1, 1939, Mayor Jan Kwapiński addressed Łódź residents via radio, urging calm and resilience as war began.

The task of each of us is to be at our normal work station, Let life go on as normal. Those who joined the army will be replaced by those who stayed

. He warned of possible shortages due to military demand and threatened severe penalties for merchants engaging in price gouging. The city had completed work on anti-aircraft trenches in parks and squares, but the mayor advised against digging them on private property.

By September 4, hundreds of reservists and volunteers crowded recruitment centers, demanding to join the army. Kwapiński asked military leaders to build defensive trenches and organize volunteer battalions, but the request was denied and Łódź was to remain undefended to minimize civilian casualties and urban destruction. The District Command issued a radio appeal for men under 50 to evacuate toward Warsaw or the Lublin Voivodeship, where new reserve units were forming.

On September 5, German troops smashed both wings of the Łódź Army during the Battle of Łódź and opened their way to the city. The previous day, wealthier residents began to leave the city. During the night of 5th to 6th of September, military and state authorities - headed by voivode Henryk Józefski and starosta Henryk Mostowski, self-government with president Jan Kwapiński and the police left the city as well, and on the night of 4–5 September the evacuation of offices and institutions began a process which lasted until noon on September 6. The city was deprived of all means of transport. Emergency services and fire brigade equipment were also taken away. At the same time, the inhabitants fled from Łódź en masse, following the Brzeziny road to Warsaw. German aircraft fired on evacuating civilians, causing casualties among defenseless refugees. Bishops Włodzimierz Jasiński and Kazimierz Tomczak announced they would stay behind to support the city's population. That day, Major Kazimierz Kowalski formed an underground resistance cell, with members including Captain Bolesław Balcerzak, scoutmaster Mieczysław Łętowski, former Mayor Aleksy Rżewski, Fabian Urbaniak and Janina Żyźniewska. The group laid the foundation for the Service for Poland's Victory in Łódź.

Also on September 6, German bombs hit the Juliusz Heinzl Palace, headquarters of the Łódź Army. Command relocated first to Mszczonów and then to a nearby forester’s lodge after further bombings. Communication with military units collapsed, and Brigadier General Wiktor Thommée assumed command.

On September 6, an organizational meeting of the Citizens' Committee of the City of Łódź took place in the City Hall at Liberty Square 14. The Committee was established to take over the management of the city abandoned by the authorities and partially depopulated. The meeting was attended by representatives of social, political and economic organizations, and was headed by suffragan bishop Kazimierz Tomczak. Six departments were established: Legal, Financial, Provisional, Educational, Social Welfare and Health. They were to direct the work of existing individual departments of the City administration. Matters of security and public order passed into the hands of the Citizens' Militia, which had been operating as an organization to fight usury and sabotage since 27 August and was now subordinated to the committee.

On the afternoon of September 8, the first German patrol entered Łódź. By evening, the 8th Army presented surrender terms to the Citizens’ Committee. That night and into September 9, Selbstschutz units seized buildings—including military barracks and the Lodzer Freie Presse newspaper office—and looted Polish and Jewish homes and shops. On September 9, the XIII Corps of the 8th Army made a triumphal entrance, marching along Piotrkowska, Rzgowska, Pabianicka, and Legionów streets. General Maximilian von Weichs greeted the parading troops from a grandstand in front of City Hall. Generalmajor Wolfgang von Plotho was appointed the city’s military commander, with headquarters at the City Council building. The Citizens’ Committee was soon relocated to 4 Kościuszki Avenue, and the 8th Army took up residence in the Grand Hotel.

On September 10, the first meeting between occupying authorities and the Citizens’ Committee presidium took place. That same day, Gunther Fonck was appointed head of the newly established Arbeitsamt (Labor Office), initially housed in the PKO building at 15 Kościuszki Avenue, later relocated to Zachodnia and Więckowskiego Streets. This office organized forced labor roundups, especially between 1940 and 1942. Harry von Craushaar, Head of Civil Administration, arrived from Wrocław and assumed civil control over the region, establishing his headquarters at the former Voivodeship Office at 15 Ogrodowa Street.

Also on September 10, Einsatzgruppe III Sicherheitspolizei, led by SS-Sturmbannführer Fritz Lipphardt, arrived and occupied the Jewish gymnasium at 7 Anstadta Avenue, which later became the Łódź Gestapo station. On September 11, the occupiers issued the first ordinances. They ordered residents to, among other things, surrender possessed weapons and introduced a curfew. The German Einsatzgruppe III paramilitary death squad entered the city on September 12.

On September 13, Commander von Plotho banned Poles from leaving the city. The same day, large cotton factories received written orders to resume production within a week. Wool mill owners were given verbal instructions. Von Craushaar issued a decree freezing food prices.

On 16 September, the German City Commissioner took power over the local government in Łódź. State offices were subordinated to the head of the Civil Administration at the command of the 8th Army, Harry von Craushaar. As the occupation progressed, the situation in the city systematically deteriorated. The Nazi authorities, which gave Łódź the status of a separate city, divided it into four administrative districts, and seven more were created in suburban areas. The German authorities renamed the city to Litzmannstadt and streets were given new, German names. One of the main streets in the city, Piotrkowska Street was renamed Adolf-Hitler-Straße.

On September 18, the Civil Commissioner officially began his role at the former City Hall in Wolności Square. A curfew from 8:00 p.m. to 5:00 a.m. was imposed on September 24. The Polizeipräsidium began operating out of the former State Police Headquarters at 152 Kilińskiego Street.

On September 29, postal services resumed at 10 Moniuszki Street, primarily serving German authorities. A POW camp was set up in the former Rosenblatt Cotton Factory at 36 Żwirki Street, while a temporary chapel camp operated at Kościelny Square. Both held Polish prisoners of war until late October.

On October 5, the German authorities disbanded the Citizens' Militia. Four days later, Civil Commissioner Leister banned street trading in food, tobacco, and clothing. On October 18, Polish-German bilingual signage was ordered for all City Council departments, along with German-only official seals.

On October 21 damaged public radio station at 130 Narutowicza Street was restored and began broadcasting. That same day, a POW camp was established in the former artillery barracks at Haller Square. The prisoners were later transported deep into the Reich.

On November 4, Hitler resolved a jurisdictional dispute by incorporating Łódź and nearby counties into the Reichsgau Wartheland, later renamed Warthegau. This region became the Third Reich’s largest administrative district, covering nearly 44,000 square kilometers and housing over 4.2 million people. On November 5, all Poles and Jews were ordered to turn in radios within 10 days. Two days later, Heinrich Himmler officially established the Gestapo station in the city. SS-Sturmbannführer Gerhard Flesch was the first commander, followed by Robert Schefe (1939–1941) and Otto Bradfisch (from April 1942). The station employed 151 staff and 683 informants, including Polish collaborators. The police banned Polish school uniforms, youth group attire, and signage in Polish. German replaced all bilingual symbols and seals. On November 9 the city, which was initially planned to serve as capital of the General Government, was formally incorporated to the Nazi Germany. Between November 9–11, the Gestapo arrested approximately 1,500 people—mainly intelligentsia and political figures—from Łódź and nearby towns. These arrests were part of a pre-planned campaign to eliminate Polish leadership. Detainees were sent to transit camps in Ruda Pabianicka and Radogoszcz, then executed in nearby forests. The first mass execution occurred on November 12 in Brus, where about 40 prisoners were killed. On November 11, the German authorities arrested around 100 Polish officers and cadets as hostages, fearing a potential uprising. Some, including doctors, were later released and forced into service under German control. Others were deported to POW camps in Germany.

On February 5, 1941, the Chief of Criminal Police in Łódź, Dr. Wilhelm Zirpins, proposed creating a penal camp for Polish children and youth. On February 17, 1941, the Reich Minister of the Interior officially confirmed the Wartheland authorities’ 1940 decision to move the regional capital from Kalisz to Łódź. On May 8, 1941, after the position was vacant for a year, Werner Ventzki was appointed Mayor of Łódź, a role he held until July 2, 1943, before volunteering for the Waffen-SS, being succeeded by the head of the local Gestapo, Otto Bradfisch. On June 17, the previous coat of arms of Łódź - the golden boat on a red background, was changed to new coat of arms: a double-armed golden swastika on a blue background, inspired by a pre-war archaeological find near Zgierz. The new emblem reflected the heraldry of the Litzmann family. A formal ceremony unveiling it was held on July 2, 1941, at the city’s Sports Hall.

Already in September 1939, the Germans carried out first arrests of Poles as part of the Intelligenzaktion and established first prisons for arrested Poles, and in November 1939 the Radogoszcz concentration camp was established, which would be soon converted into the infamous Radogoszcz prison. As part of the Intelligenzaktion, many Poles arrested in Łódź, Pabianice and other nearby settlements were imprisoned in the Radogoszcz camp and then either deported to other concentration camps or mostly murdered in the forests in the present-day district of Łagiewniki and the nearby village of Lućmierz-Las. Thousands of Poles were massacred there in late 1939 and early 1940, including teachers, activists, local officials, journalists, lawyers, parliamentarians, etc. In addition, eleven Polish boy scouts from Łódź were murdered by the occupiers in the Okręglik forest near Zgierz in March 1940. The Germans also destroyed the monument of Polish national hero Tadeusz Kościuszko (rebuilt after the war).

The occupiers established various camps in the city, including a camp for the Romani people deported from abroad, who were soon exterminated at Chełmno, a penal "education" forced labour camp in the present-day district of Sikawa, four transit camps for Poles expelled from the city and region, and a racial research camp for expelled Poles. In the latter, Poles were subjected to racial selection before deportation to forced labour in Germany, and Polish children were taken from their parents and sent to Germanisation camps. Most of the children never returned. In 1942–1945, the German Sicherheitspolizei operated a concentration camp for kidnapped Polish children of two to 16 years of age from various parts of occupied Poland. It served as a forced labour camp, penal camp, internment camp and racial research center. The children were subjected to starvation, exhausting labour, beating even up to death and diseases, and the camp was nicknamed "little Auschwitz" due to its conditions. Many children died in the camp. From December 1943 to March 1944, Theimetall-Borsig AG operated inside the former waste factory of Izrael Poznański, producing tank, rifle, and submarine parts. At the same site, Wotanwerke GmbH began manufacturing aircraft components, employing around 600 workers.

==== Jewish community ====
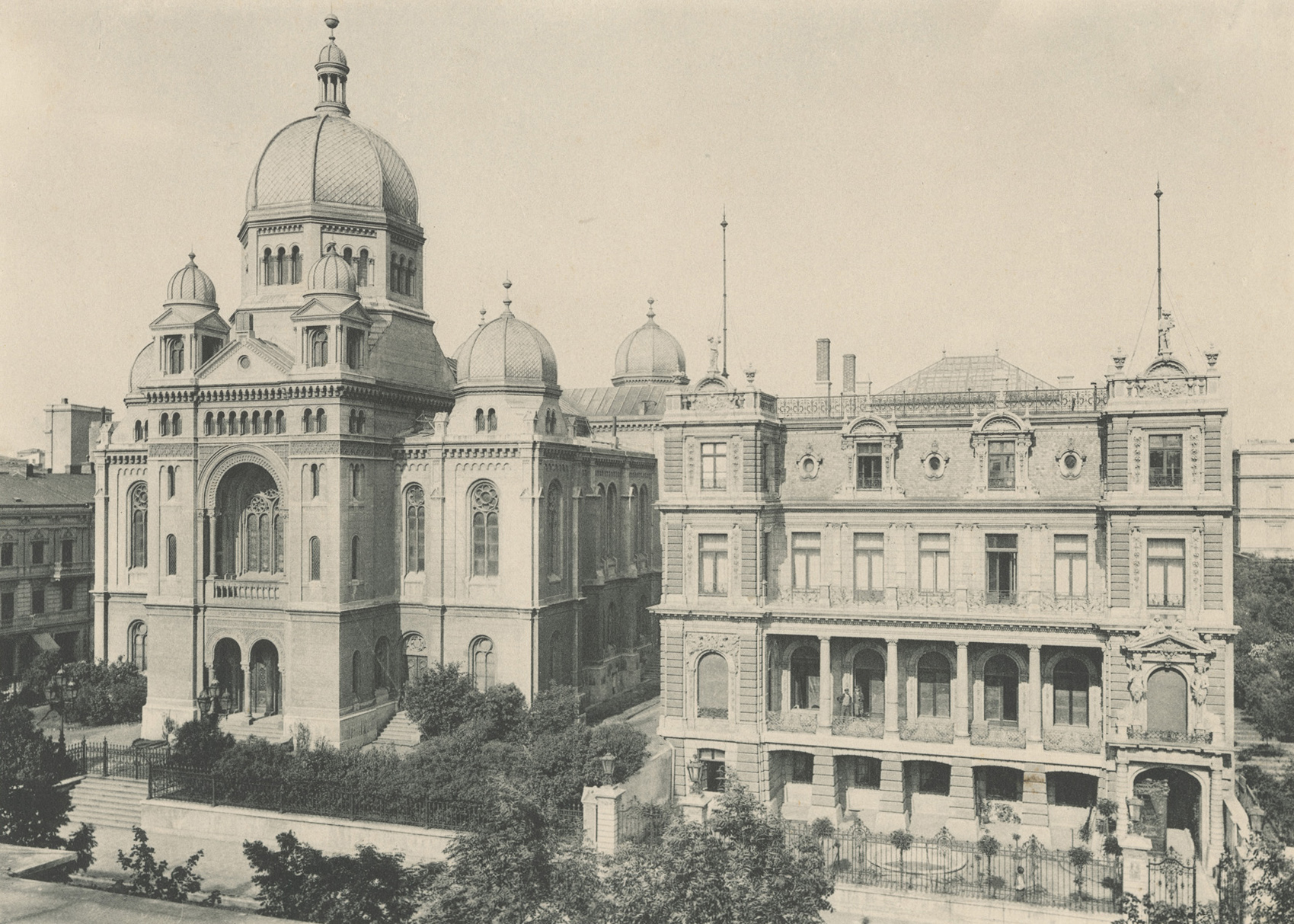
Great Synagogue in Łódź

After September 1, the Jewish community in the city continued its routine activities. On the first day of the war, the community board, led by chairman Jakub Leib Mincberg, visited the Voivodeship Office, where Mincberg submitted a formal declaration to vice voivode Stanisław Wrona, expressing the community's readiness to cooperate with both state and social authorities on behalf of the entire Jewish population. The next day, Starosta Henryk Mostowski, informed the community of an attachment order concerning its premises at 18 Pomorska Street, though the intended purpose for the premises remains unknown.

On September 3, the community's leadership sent a circular to all departments, offices, and institutions of the community, advising that, due to the wartime situation, "maximum savings and the most rational management" were now required. The letter called for proposals—within two days—for suspending or dissolving certain agencies of the community. In response to new restrictions on vehicle movement imposed by city authorities, the Jewish community board submitted a request on September 4 to the Military Department of the City Administration (Polish: Wydział Wojskowy Zarządu Miejskiego). Signed by Chairman Mincberg and Secretary Pinkus Nadel, the letter requested permits for four funeral caravans to allow the transport of the deceased to the cemetery without hindrance. Despite Mincberg’s flight from Łódź to Vilnius and the deteriorating conditions in the city, the community’s operations continued, albeit at a reduced pace. Correspondence was maintained with the Civil Registry Office to register births. Under the direction of the board, aid was organized for wounded refugees of German air raids. On September 8, the body of Dr. Jakub Schlosser was brought in for burial.

The first anti-Jewish ordinances appeared on September 14, 1939, when the provisions of the head of the civil management came into force, issued by Harry von Craushaar, SS-Brigadeführer at the 8th Army on the closure of bank accounts, deposits and safes belonging to Jews, and about banning them from storing cash of over a thousand marks, which initiated the elimination of Jews from economic life in the city. On October 8, a propaganda demonstration of the German population to celebrate the occupation of the city and the release of Łódź Germans from national captivity took place at the City Theater on Cegielniana Street (modern Jaracza Street). Lodz was visited by the minister of propaganda of the Third Reich, Joseph Goebbels. As a result, anti-Semitic statements intensified and many Jews were murdered. Discrimination and persecution of the Jewish population in Łódź had begun immediately in September 1939. Craushaar's ordinance of October 13, 1939 forcing the Łódź Jewish Community to supply 700 workers daily which then increased to 2,000, without pay, was to normalize and legalize the forced labour work of the Jewish people. However, this did not stop the practice of catching and forcing Jews to humiliating works in private Volksdeutsche apartments. Further regulations, including the order issued on November 11, 1939 by the city commissioner, for marking Jewish shops with inscriptions in German and Polish, and which facilitated the confiscation of Jewish private property. This was done by soldiers, members of Selbstschutz recruited from local volksdeutsch as well as police officers who robbed shops and premises of Polish and Jewish organizations. Private apartments were attacked and plundered. Activists from various political organizations including, among others, Markus Marchew, vice president of the General Zionists in Łódź, and Aleksander Vogel, secretary of this organization, Icek Alter, Benjamin Gelbart and Izrael Judko were arrested and executed.

A number of police prohibitions were also introduced to make it impossible for the free movement of Jews, including being on the city streets at certain times and using any means of transport. On November 7, Jews were prohibited from entering Piotrkowska Street. On November 13, Jews and Poles were banned from changing their place of residence without the permission of the authorities. A day later, the president of the Kalisz region, SS-Brigadeführer Friedrich Uebelhoer ordered the marking of Jews with a yellow armband. On December 11 Governor of Warta Country Arthur Greiser changed this ordinance to the obligation to wear a Star of David on the right side of the chest and on the back. The secret Polish Council to Aid Jews "Żegota", established by the Polish resistance movement, operated in the city.

=== People's Republic of Poland ===
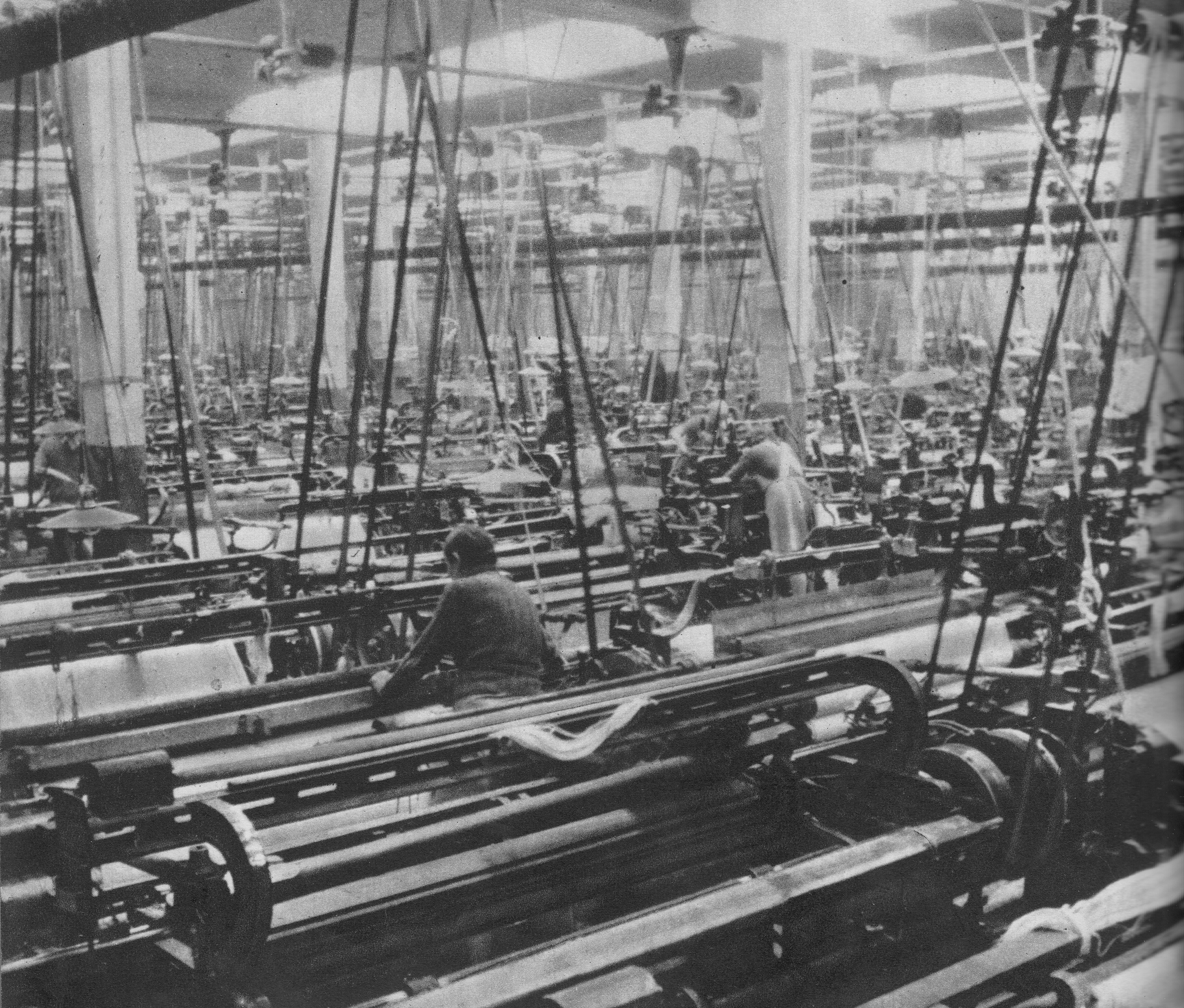
Weaving mill, 1950s

The post-war change of political and economic system meant the introduction of centrally planned socialist economy and political and economic integration to the Soviet Union. For Łódź, this meant the re-opening of the eastern market and further development of the textile industry, mainly cotton and wool. New housing estates were built in large scale to accommodate the large growth of the new residents who moved to the city.

Two days after Łódź was captured by the Red Army an operational group came to town with Ignacy Loga-Sowiński as the representative of the Provisional Government. The next day the attorney approved the previously appointed Interim Presidium City Council, headed by Jan Waltratsu. Kazimierz Witaszewski was appointed the President of Łódź, and J. Waltratus became his deputy. In 1945, the Polish Workers' Party in the city numbered nearly 7,000 members and grew fast. Voivodeship structures were overseen by Ignatius Loga-Sowiński and municipal ones by Władysław Nieśmiałek. Until 1950, the Presidents (Mayor) of Łódź were: Kazimierz Witaszewski (until March 1945), Kazimierz Mijał (1945–1947), Eugeniusz Stawiński (1947–1949) and Marian Minor (1949–1950).

For the first time, the Municipal National Council in Łódź (Polish: Rada Narodowa miasta Łodzi) met at the Municipal Theater on March 7, 1945. At the beginning of its existence, councilors were delegated to it on a parity basis (PPR and PPS were represented by 20 councilors each, SD by 10, SL by 5, 12 for the trade unions, 9 for the socio-cultural organizations and 2 for the youth organizations).

The chairman of the Council was the president of Łódź Kazimierz Mijal, his deputy Jan Stefan Haneman (PPS), and the members of the presidium: Lucjan Głowacki, Artur Kopacz (SD) and Eugeniusz Stawiński. On May 8, 1945, Jan Stefan Haneman took the position of MRN chairman, followed by Edward Andrzejak (1946–1950).

In early 1946, the city territory was expanded up to 211.6 sqm. Included then in Łódź, incl. Ruda Pabianicka, Radogoszcz and Chojny and some communes: Rąbień, Brus, Widzew, Gospodarz, Wiskitno, Nowosolna, Dobra and Łagiewniki. City Hall (Polish: Rada Narodowa miasta Łodzi) was moved to the now expanded Juliusz Heinzel Palace in 104 Piotrkowska Street while the Izrael Poznański Palace was the seat of the Presidium of the Voivodeship National Council of Łódź (Polish: Prezydium Wojewódzkiej Rady Narodowej w Łodzi.

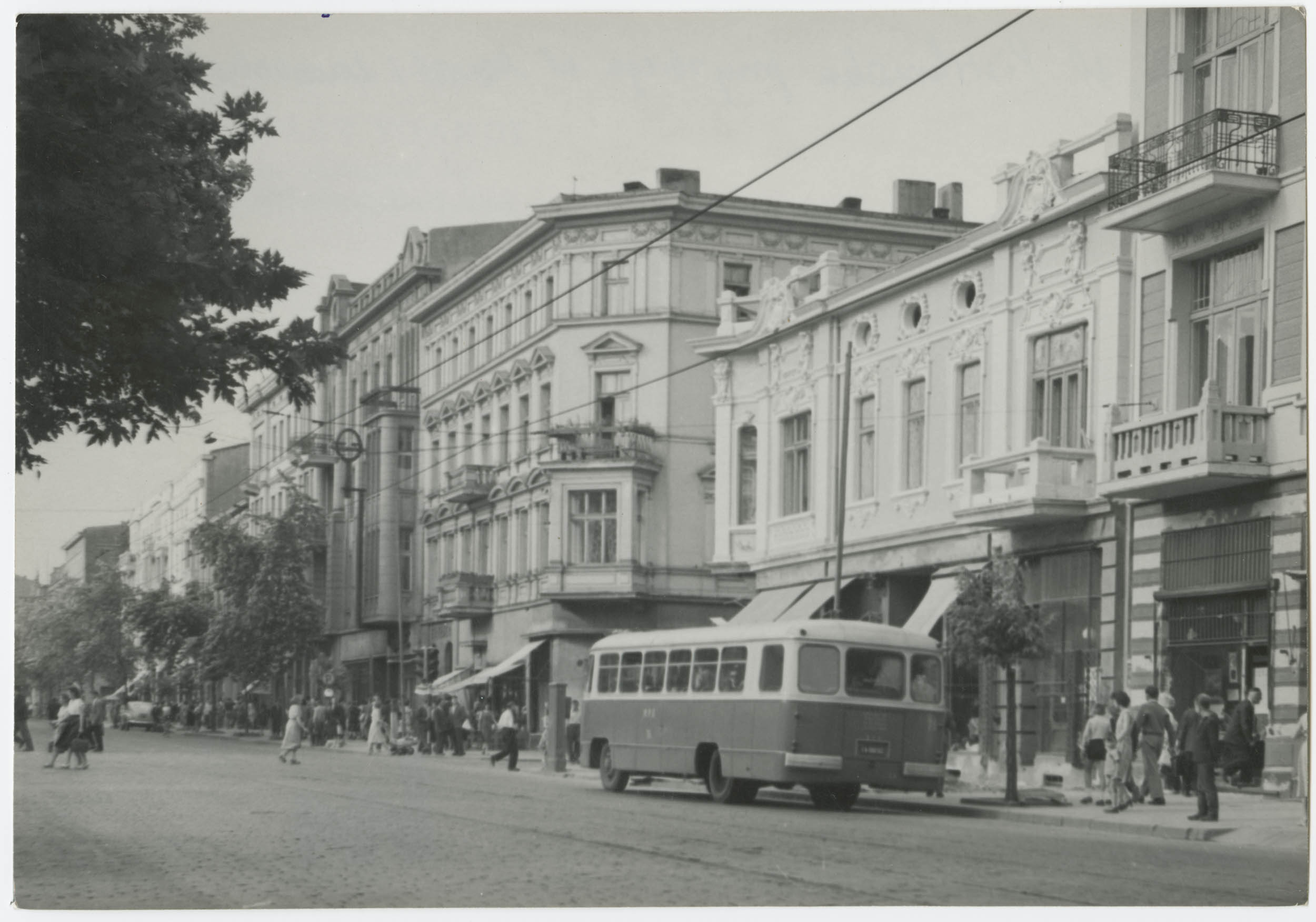
Łódź in the early 1960s

After the war, in 1945–48, Łódź served as the informal capital of Poland. Most central offices were temporarily relocated to Łódź, mainly due to the lack of damage in the city, unlike the massive destruction of Warsaw. Proximity of the city to Warsaw and its location in the center of the new Polish territory contributed to this decision. In the 1940s and 1950s, Łódź was changing rapidly – the area of the city was increased four times, the lack of damage attracted new residents (in 1951 already 646,000), the industry was nationalized and its industry structure changed. In addition to the still-dominant industrial function, Łódź is also becoming a large scientific, academic and cultural center. Already in 1945, the University of Łódź, the Łódź University of Technology, the State Music Conversatorium, the School of Fine Arts, the University of Rural Economy and the only Textile Institute in Poland were created, and in 1948 the famous State Film School (today's State Film School, TV and Theater). From From February to November 1952 the First Secretary of the Lodz Party Committee was Jan Ptasiński. In September 1955, Michalina Tatarkówna-Majkowska became the First Secretary of the Łódź Committee of the Polish United Workers' Party.

=== Housing construction ===
Immediately after World War II, Łódź's general spatial development plans were developed. One of their main assumptions was the commencement of large-scale multi-family housing. There were more plans than implementation, but several estates in the 50s were created. They started with Bałuty district, not accidentally, as the poorest people of Łódź always lived there, so the choice was excellent from an ideological point of view. In addition, this was the location of Łódź Ghetto during the Holocaust and some buildings were demolished by the Germans, especially in the southern part, close to Polnocna Street, a fact which made it easier for constructing big housing estate. Bałuty was to become a representative part of Łódź and was planned to become a large, working-class housing estate. Kind of a counterweight to bourgeois Śródmieście, but also to the direction of the city's development. Until now Łódź has been developing towards the south while now the emphasis was towards the north. A huge residential district was to be built in Bałuty, designed by a team of architects from Warsaw from the Zakład Osiedli Robotniczych. Ryszard Karłowicz was its manager. He lived in the capital, but he came to Łódź for consultations. According to the assumptions, a housing estate for 40,000 residents of Łódź was to be built. The construction of another housing estate began in 1951. Called Bałuty I, it was designed by Łódź architects from Miastoprojekt, Bolesław Tatarkiewicz and Romuald Furmanek. It was built in the area of Wojska Polskiego street, Tokarzewskiego Street and Franciszkańska Street.

== Contemporary period ==
The economic crisis of the 1990s also had many positive consequences. It caused an increase in the importance of the services sector, including services of metropolitan (regional) significance, forced the restructuring of industry and the creation of special economic zones, which over time attracted new investors. At the turn of the 20th and 21st centuries, Łódź began to develop again, not as a "textile center". In 2010, the reconstruction of the downtown near the Łódź Fabryczna station began, along with the construction of the so-called 90 ha area. New Center of Łódź district (Polish: Nowe Centrum Łodzi) and Special Art Zone in the revitalized historic EC1 heat and power plant.

Łódź co-hosted several international sports events, incl. the EuroBasket 2009, the EuroBasket Women 2011, the 2014 FIVB Volleyball Men's World Championship and the 2019 FIFA U-20 World Cup.

== Gallery ==
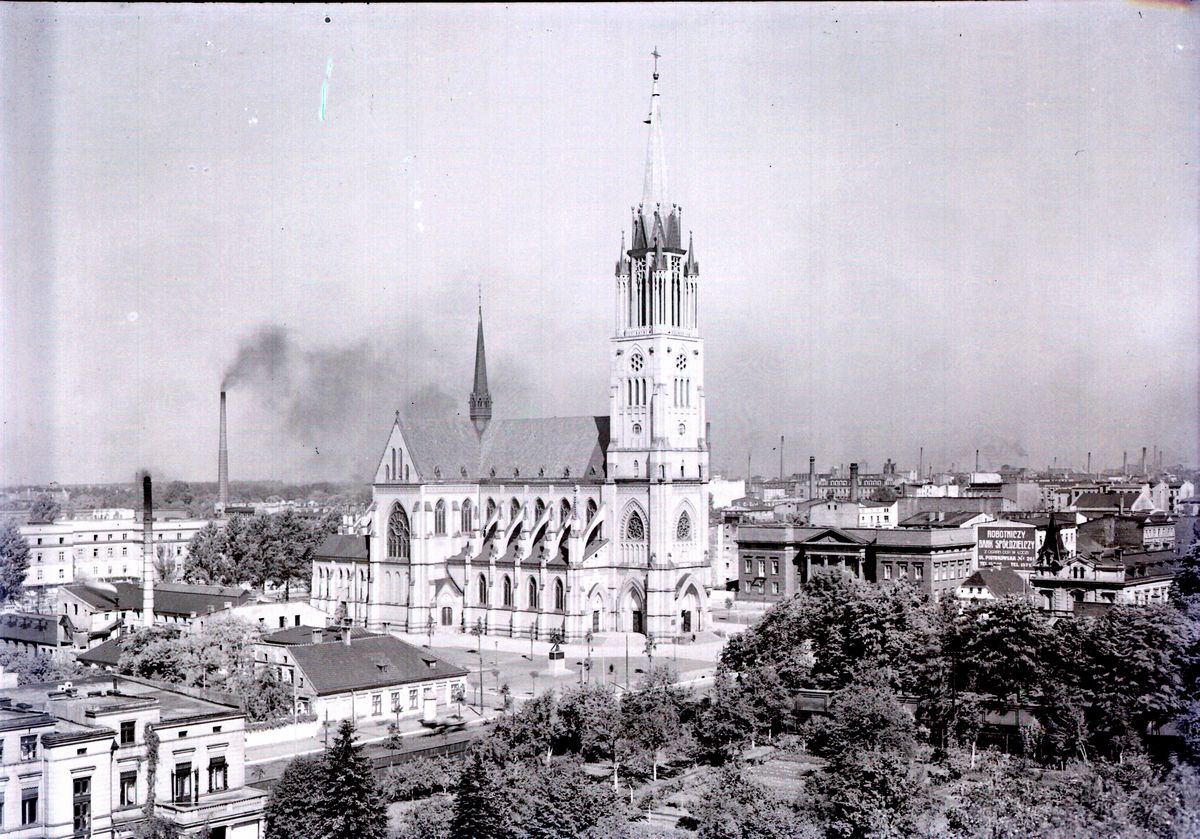
Łódź Cathedral

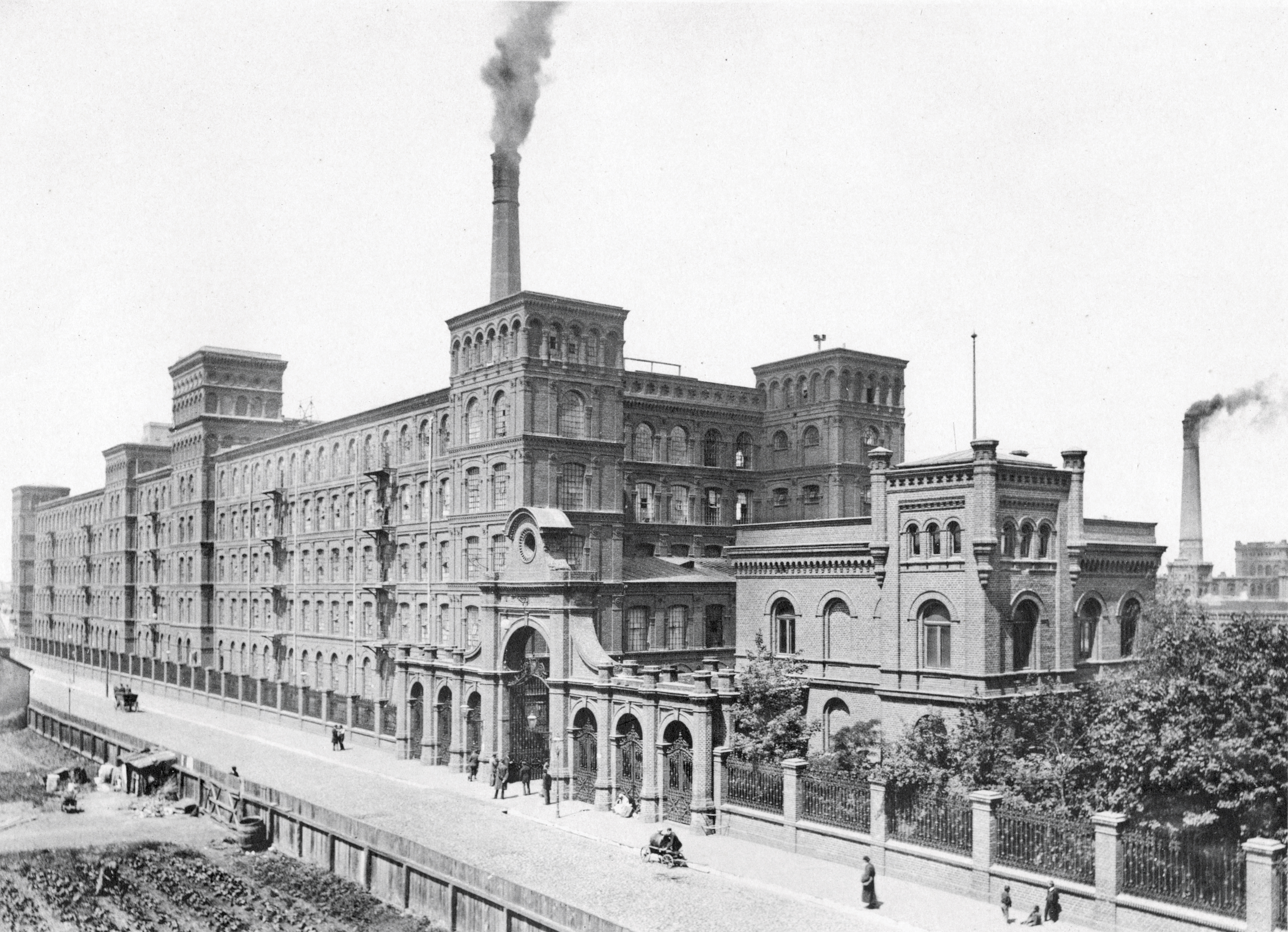
Izrael Poznański Factory

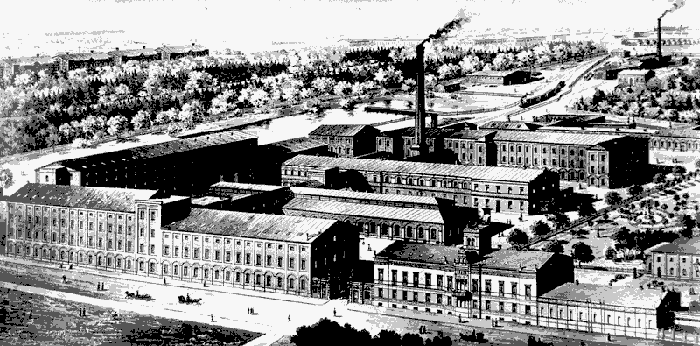
Karol Scheibler's Factory

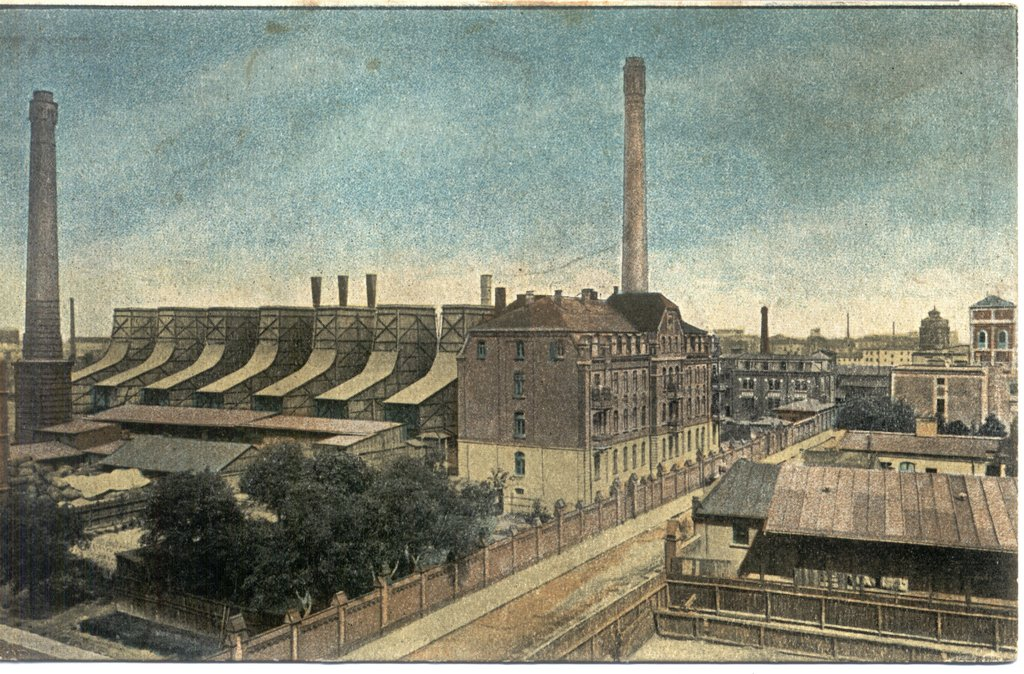
EC1 power plant

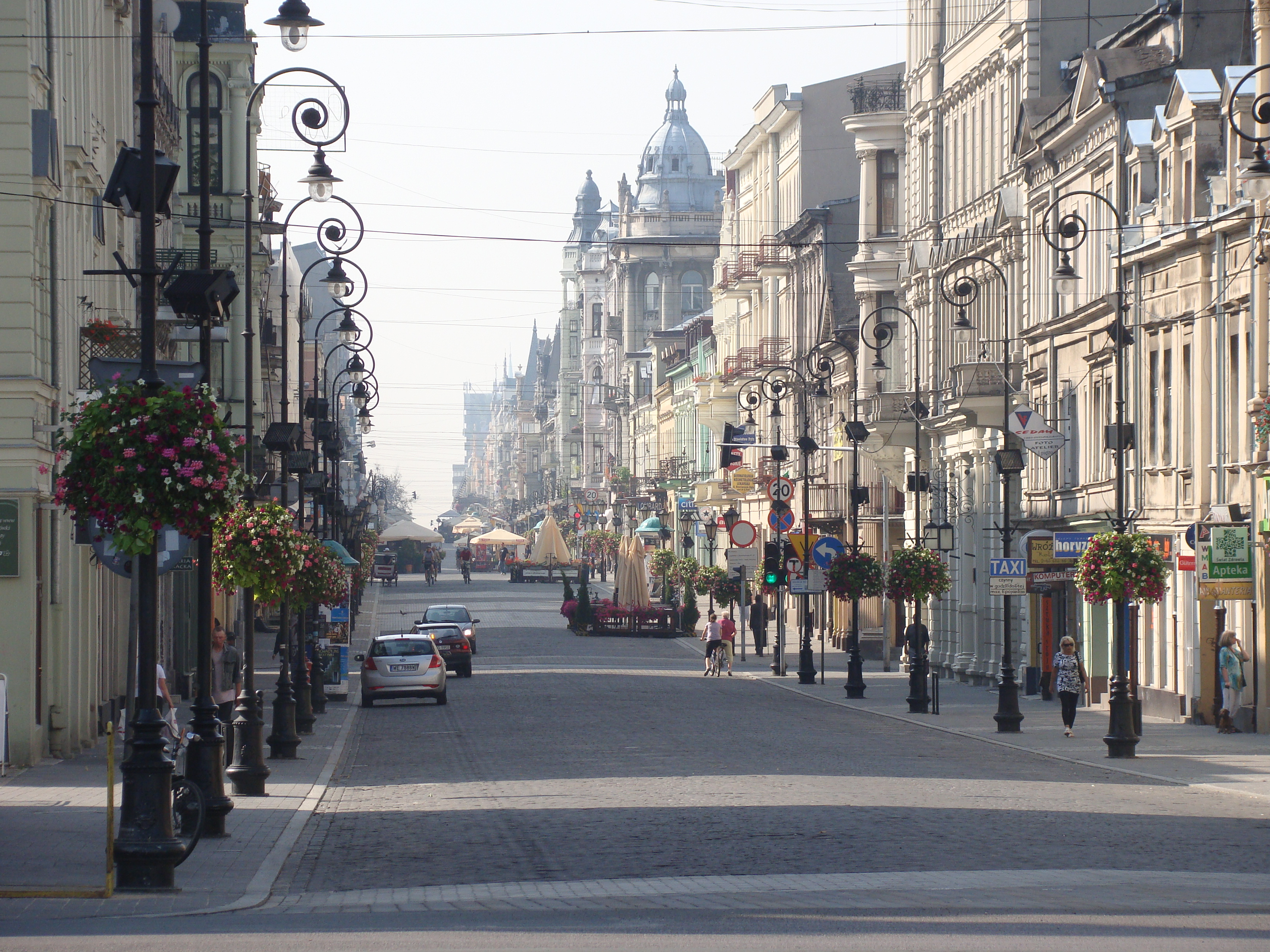
Piotrkowska Street

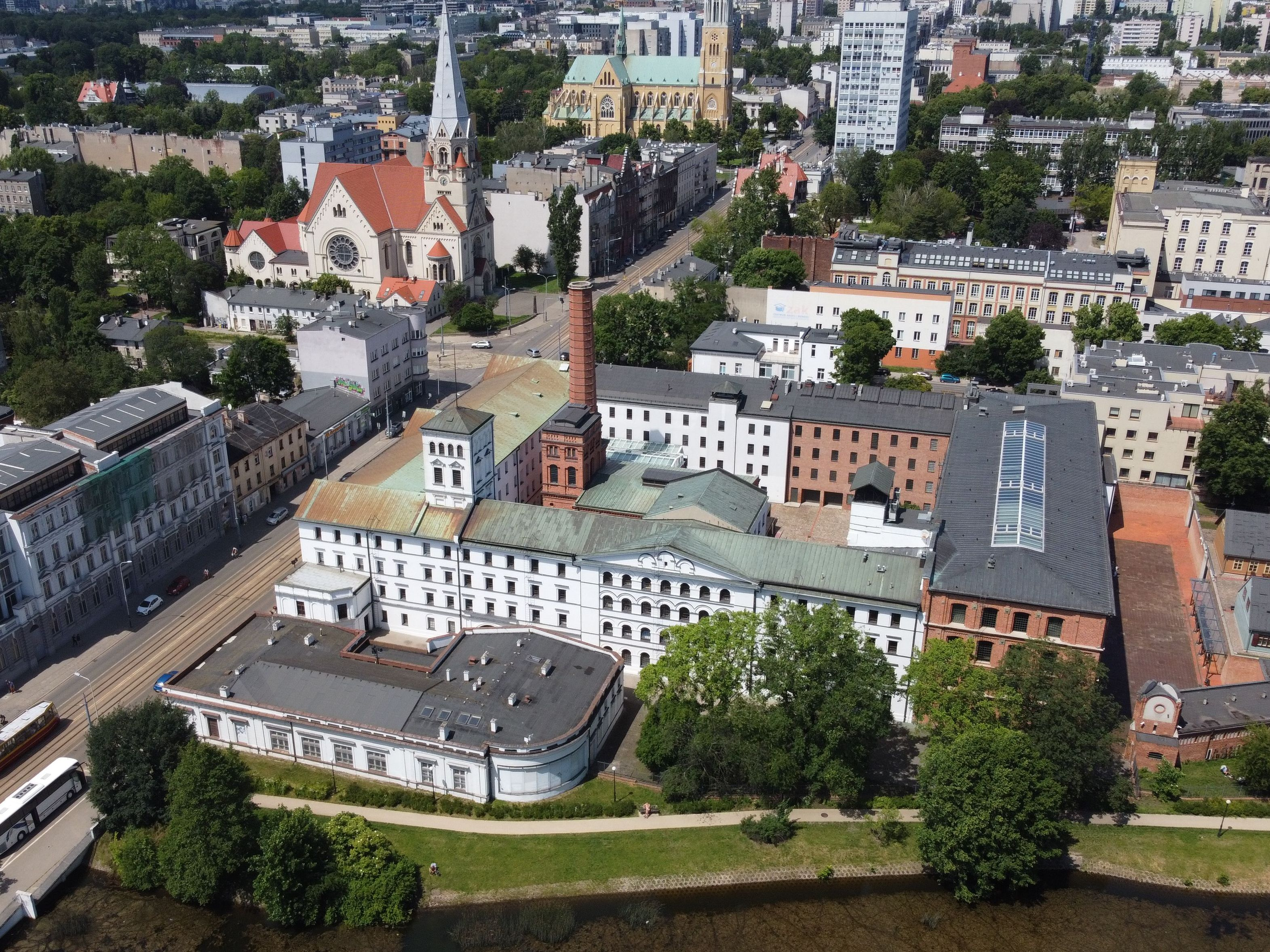
Ludwik Geyer's White Factory

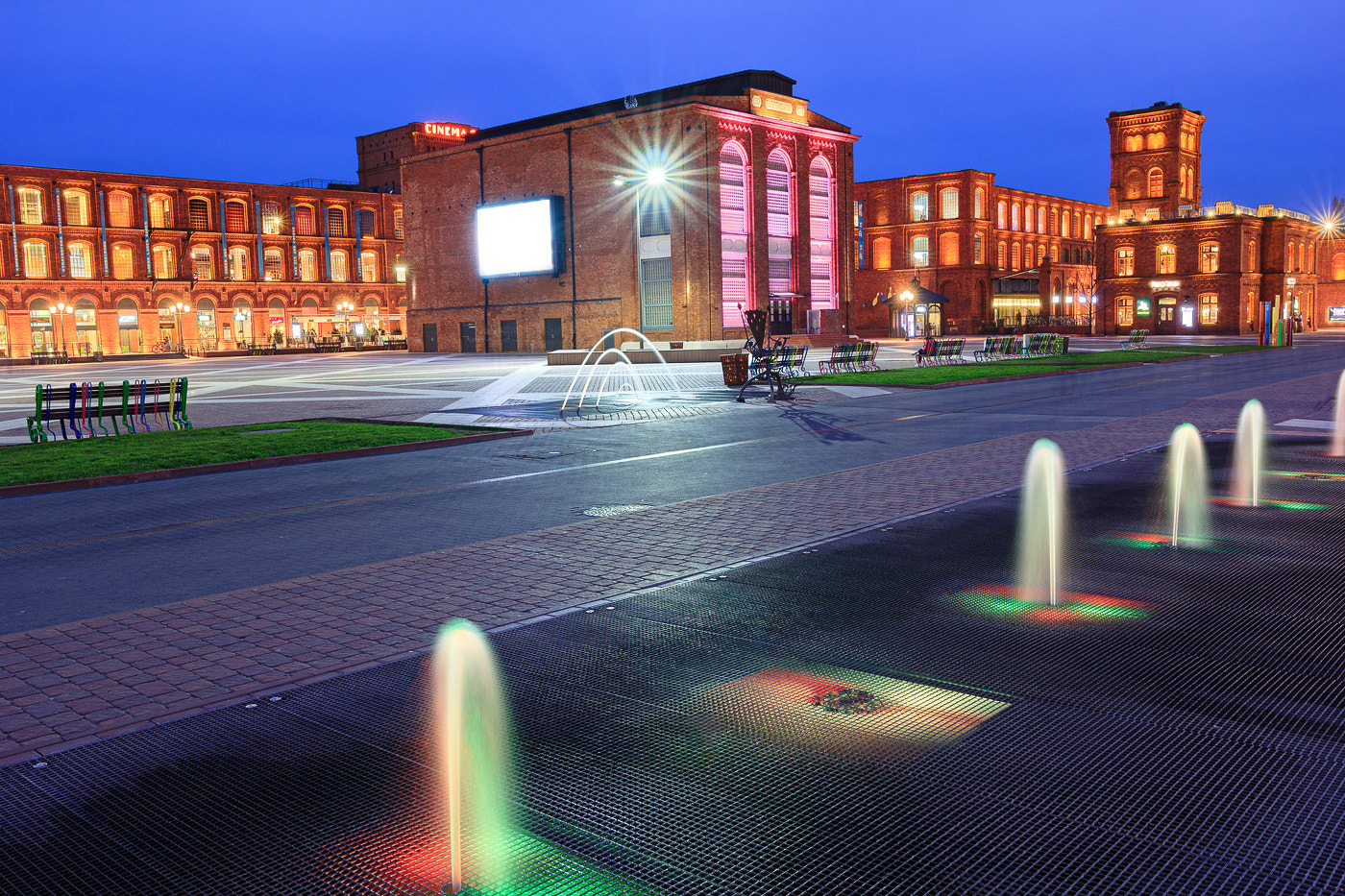
Manufaktura

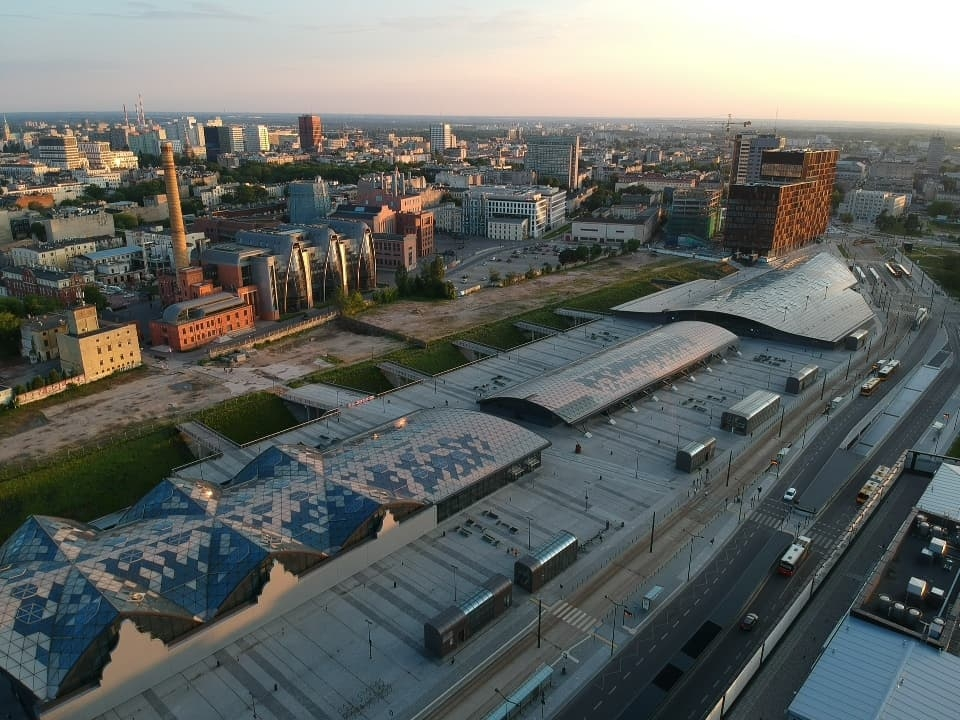
Łódź Fabryczna Railway Station

== See also ==
- Timeline of Łódź
