= Liberty Square, Łódź =

Public square in Łódź, Poland

Liberty Square
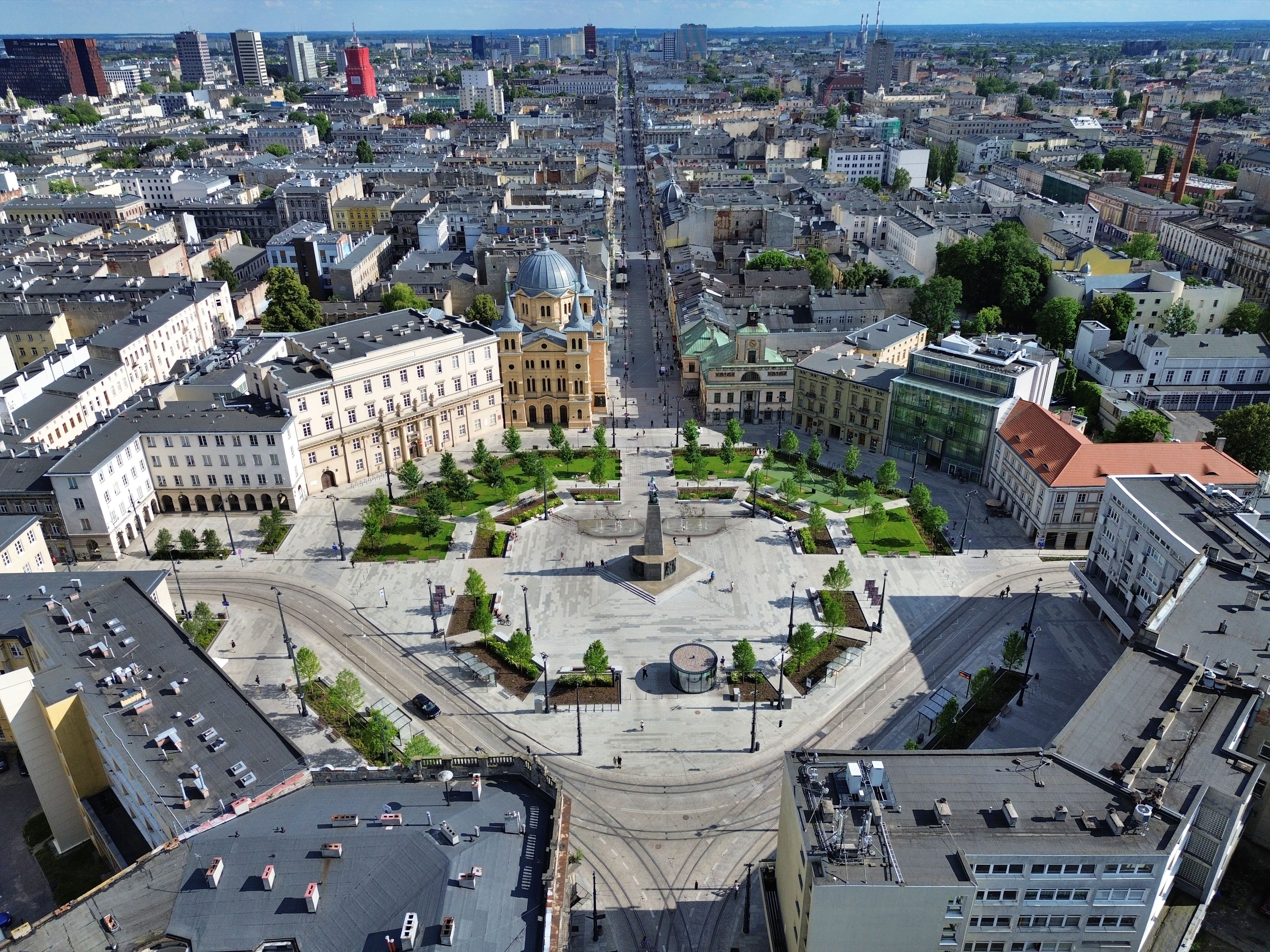
- Aerial view, 2024

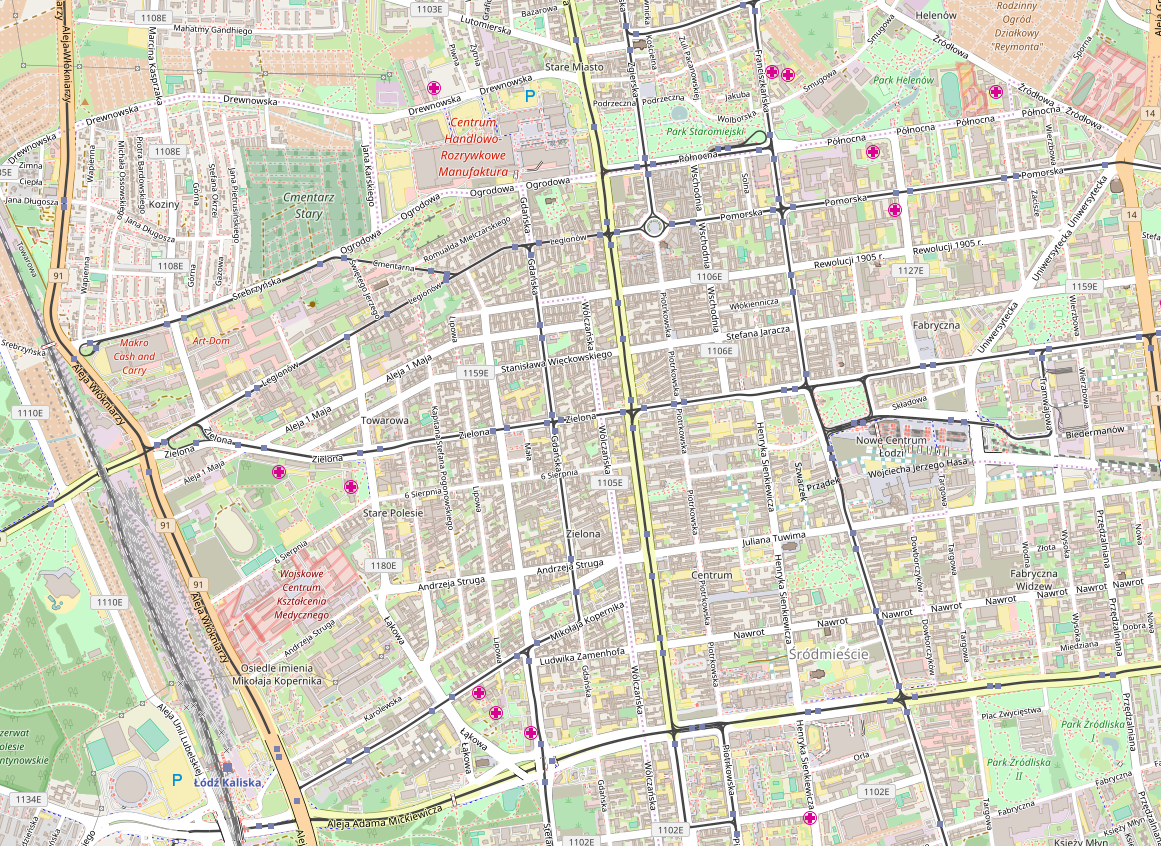
- Location within the city of Łódź
- Native name: Plac Wolności (Polish)
- Former names: Rynek Nowego Miasta (New Town Market)
- Namesake: Poland's independence in 1918
- Location: Łódź, Poland
- Postal code: 91-415
- Coordinates: 51°46′36″N 19°27′16″E
- North: Nowomiejska Street
- East: Pomorska Street
- South: Piotrkowska Street
- West: Legionów Street

Construction
- Completed: c. 1823

Liberty Square (Polish: Plac Wolności) is an octagonal public square located in central Łódź, Poland. Completed in 1823, it is the northern endpoint of the commercial Piotrkowska Street. Its present name commemorates Poland regaining its independence in 1918.

== Name ==
When initially marked out, the square was named Rynek Nowego Miasta (transl. New Town Market) as it symbolised the beginning of a new industrial settlement. Following Poland's independence in 1918, it was renamed to Liberty Square to honour the freedom and liberty after 123 years of foreign rule in Poland.

== Geography ==
The octagonal square is situated in what was to became the heart of the newly-founded city in the early 19th century. It is situated south of the old medieval marketplace, which is now known as Rynek Starego Miasta (transl. Old Town Market). It was once an important transport hub, connecting busy trade routes extending to and from Piotrków Trybunalski as well as other surrounding townships like Konstantynów and Brzeziny. The routes crossed at Liberty Square, and travellers or merchants were able to arrive at the square regardless of the direction as they entered Łódź.

The contemporary square is flanked by four exit points in each direction: Piotrkowska Street to the south, Nowomiejska to the north, Pomorska to the east, and Legionów to the west. By street numbering in ascending order, Piotrkowska commences at the square and runs 4.2 kilometres (2.6 mi) south to terminate at a similarly-named public area – Plac Niepodległości (Independence Square) in the Górniak neighbourhood. This forms the main vertical axis of Łódź, part of which is available for general use by vehicles and the other is pedestrianised.

== History ==
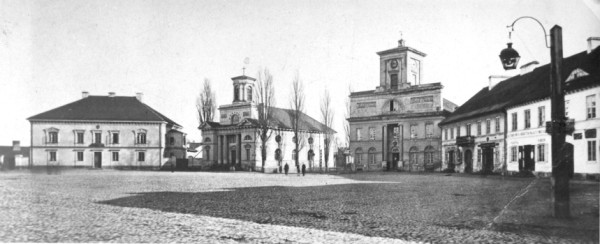
The oldest photograph of Łódź (1860), illustrating the Old City Hall and the formerly Protestant church before its 1889–1891 remodelling

A central marketplace was commissioned by Rajmund Rembieliński, an economist tasked by the Administrative Council of Congress Poland to organise the textile industry across the region. Inaugurated in 1823, the octagonal square was designated to become the centre-point of a new settlement that later grew into the modern city. Rembieliński advocated for concentrated classicist urban planning, with axial and symmetrical street systems. As such, the streets around Liberty Square intersect each other to form a grid. The surrounding roads were named after towns in proximity to Łódź or after the four cardinal directions, for example Zachodnia, Wschodnia and Północna (West, East and North Streets) retain their original designations to this day. Some were renamed over the course of history, for instance Południowa (South Street) to Rewolucji 1905 r. in commemoration of the Łódź Insurrection, and Średnia (Central Street) changed to Pomorska after Poland regained access to the Baltic Sea through Pomerania following independence.

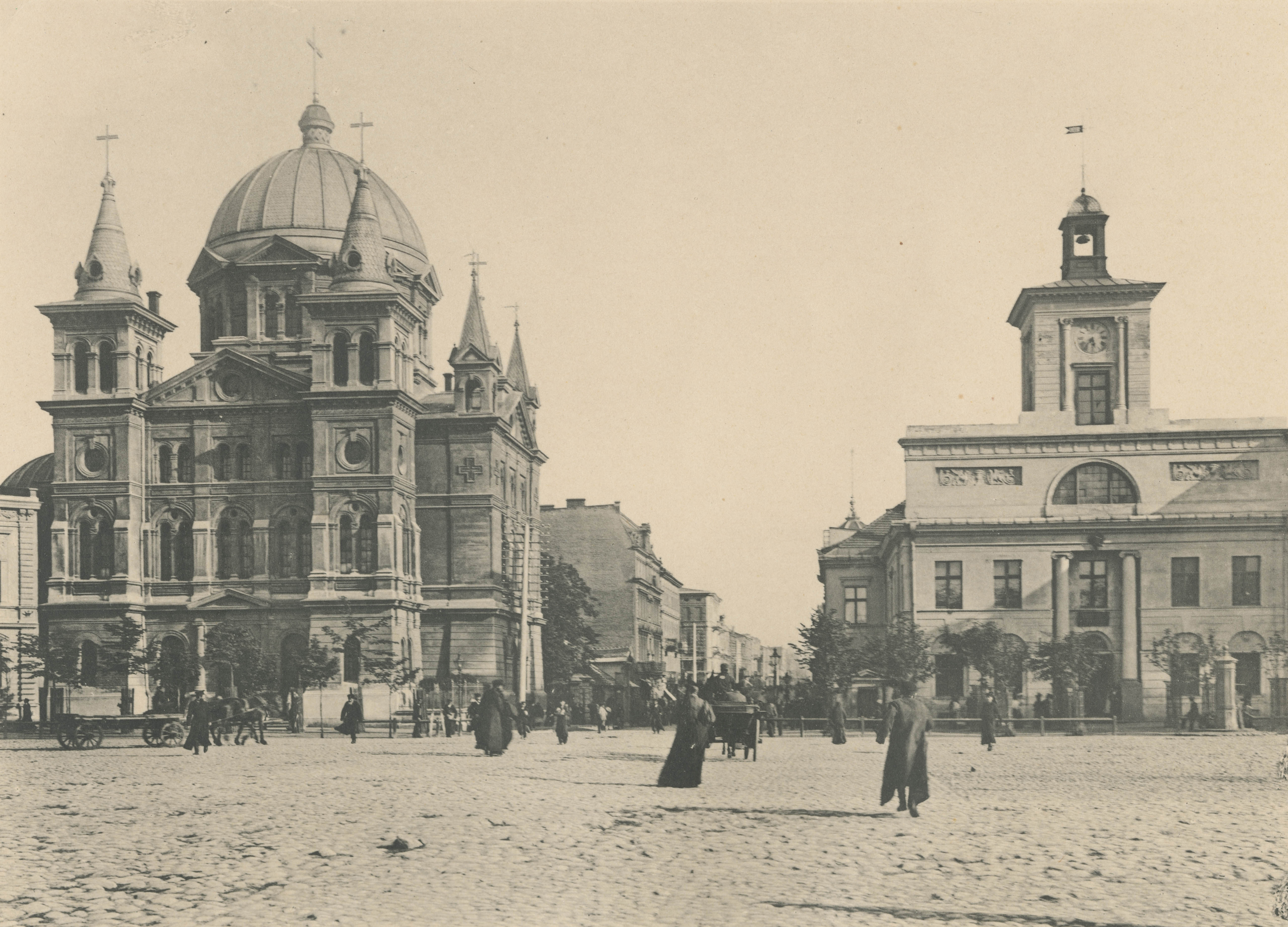
The cobbled square before the creation of a tram network, 1896

In 1827, the Old City Hall, or Magistrate, was constructed on the square's southern fringe in the Neoclassical style; it can be classified as the city's first significant brick building which survived without major alterations. The year 1828 saw the inauguration of a Protestant church on the adjacent corner which strongly resembled the magistrate building in shape and architectural manner. In 1857, a secondary technical school opened next to that church; the edifice now hosts the Museum of Archaeology and Ethnography. Between 1889 and 1891, the current domed church was erected in place of the former and much smaller place of worship. Its design was conceived by German-born entrepreneur Otto Gehlig, who collaborated on the project with the city's chief architect and planner Hilary Majewski. In 1898, the square was transformed from a marketplace into a more representative and dignifying plaza along with a newly established tram network.

During the Second Polish Republic (1918–1939), the square was a place of manifestations, marches and public events. The 1930s saw new monuments and features erected. After the Invasion of Poland in 1939, it was renamed by the occupying German forces to 'Freiheitsplatz' and in 1940 to 'Deutschlandplatz'. These were revoked in the aftermath of the Second World War. Under the Polish People's Republic (1947–1989), some of the square's northern tenement buildings were deemed obsolete and demolished; they were replaced by arcaded apartment blocks in the controversial Brutalist architectural style. In 1971, the urban area of Plac Wolności became protected cultural property (zabytek), and in 2015 it was inscribed into Poland's more prestigious List of Historic Monuments (pomnik historii).

Due to its poor state coupled with outdated infrastructure, the octagonal square underwent a major restoration and redevelopment effort from 2022 to 2024. Most notable surface changes included rerouting the tram network to only half of the square, thus eliminating the previous roundabout and allowing pedestrian traffic on the other half, as well as new greenery, amenities and a playground.

== Features ==
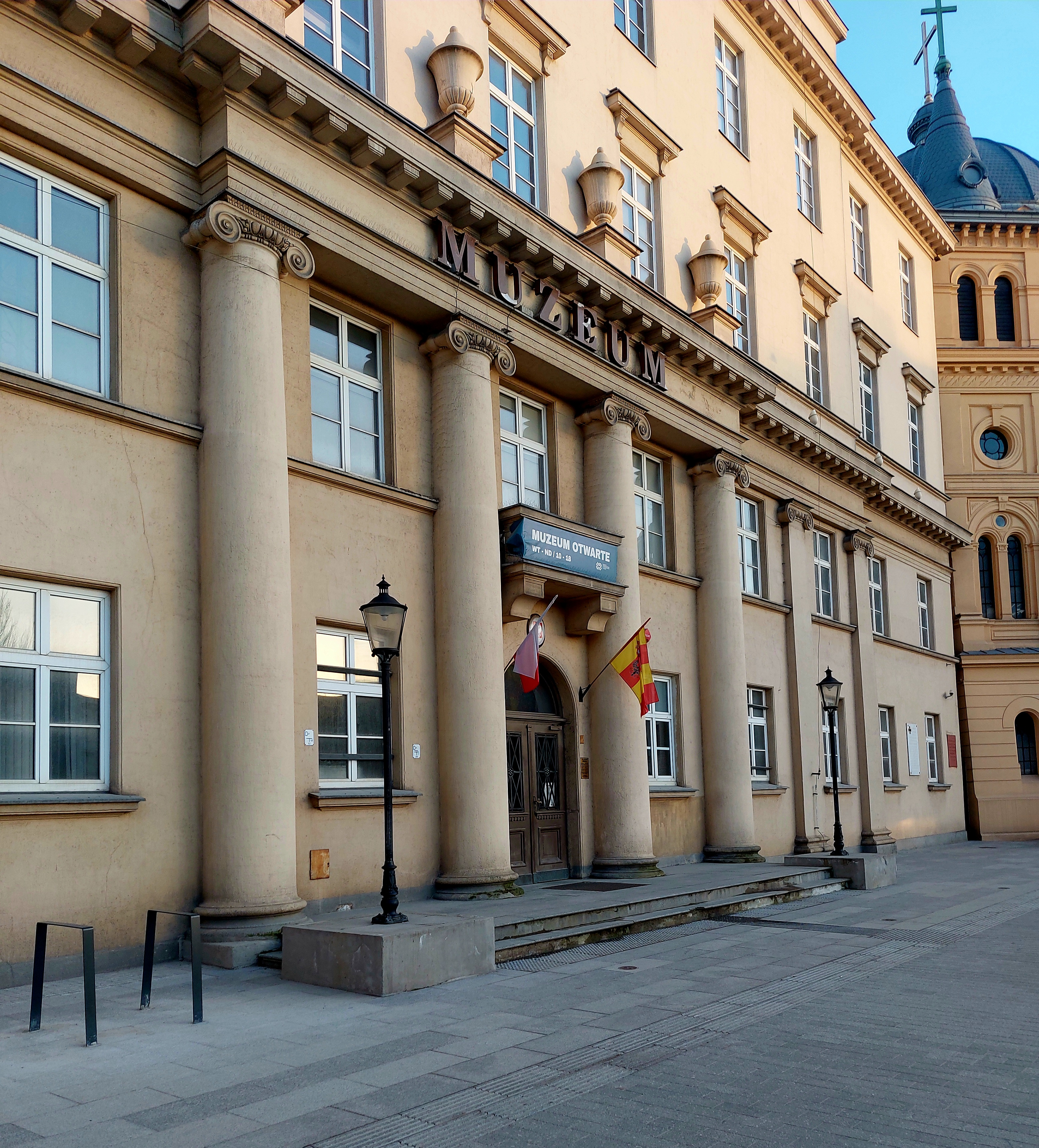
Entry to the Museum of Archaeology and Ethnography from the square

=== Monuments ===
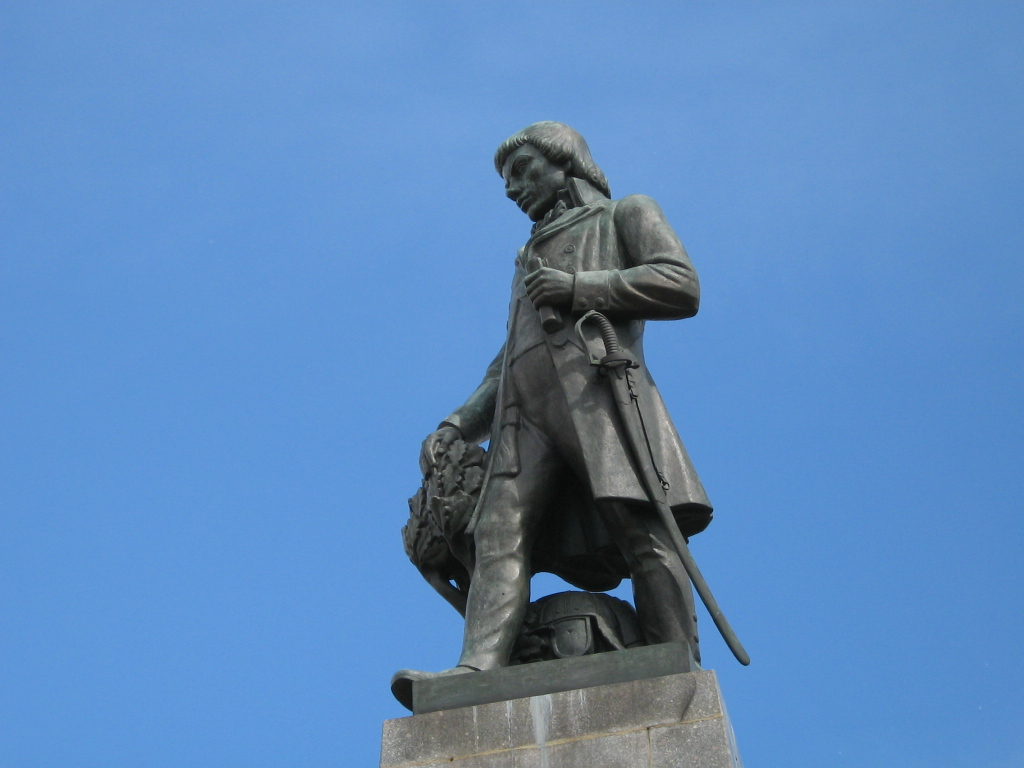
Monument commemorating Tadeusz Kościuszko, recreated in 1960

The central feature of the square is a monument dedicated to Polish, Lithuanian and American freedom fighter Tadeusz Kościuszko. Measuring 17 metres (56 ft) in total height, it was initially erected between 1927 and 1930, and was unveiled to the public on 14 December 1930. Destroyed by the Nazis during the Second World War, the current memorial dates to 1960 and is an exact replica of the original.

The plaza also features a small 1930s fountain flanked by decorative fish, and the main entrypoint into the city's sewerage system that is managed by the Museum of the Sewer Tube (Muzeum Kanału "Dętka"), a branch of the City Museum based at the nearby Poznański Palace. The red-brick dried canals, designed by British engineer William Heerlein Lindley, are open to tourists.

=== Buildings ===
Among the recognisable structures or places of interest are:

- Church of the Descent of the Holy Spirit (Kościół Zesłania Ducha Świętego), now Catholic and formerly the Protestant Church of the Holy Trinity.
- Museum of Archaeology and Ethnography (Muzeum Archeologiczne i Etnograficzne).
- Old City Hall hosting the State Archives (Ratusz, Archiwum Państwowe).
- Pharmacy Museum (Muzeum Farmacji), where the city's first chemist/drugstore opened.
- A branch of the City Library called 'Wolność' (Biblioteka Miejska, WOLNOŚĆ filia nr 39).
- Historical tenements and socialist apartment blocks.

== See also ==
- History of Łódź
