= History of the Jews in Łódź =

History of the Jews in Łódź began at the end of the 18th century when the first Jews arrived to the city. The community grew and became one of the largest Jewish communities in Europe. During the Holocaust, the Jewish population of the city was concentrated in the northern-district of the city, Bałuty, where a Nazi ghetto was established, the Łódź Ghetto. The community numbers a few hundreds and is headquartered at the Gebhardt Palace located in 18 Pomorska Street in the city.

== History ==
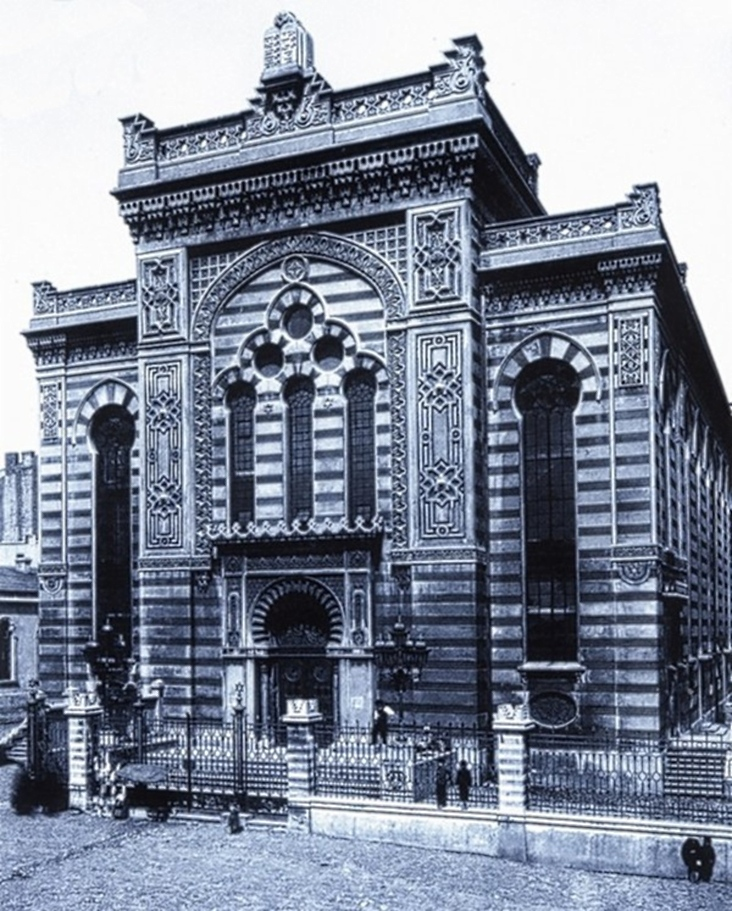
Alte Szil Synagogue in Wolborska Street

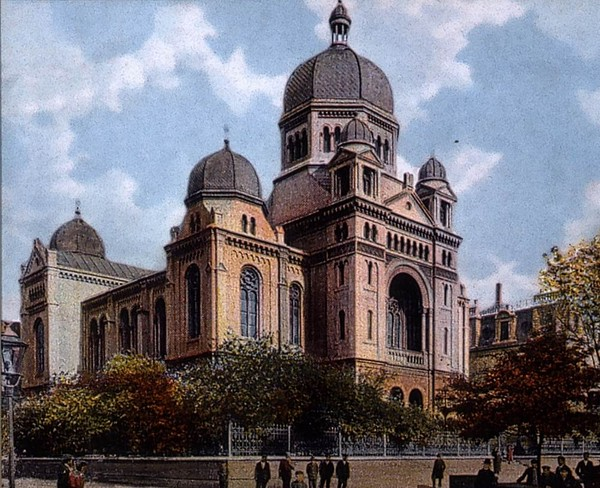
Great Synagogue in the city

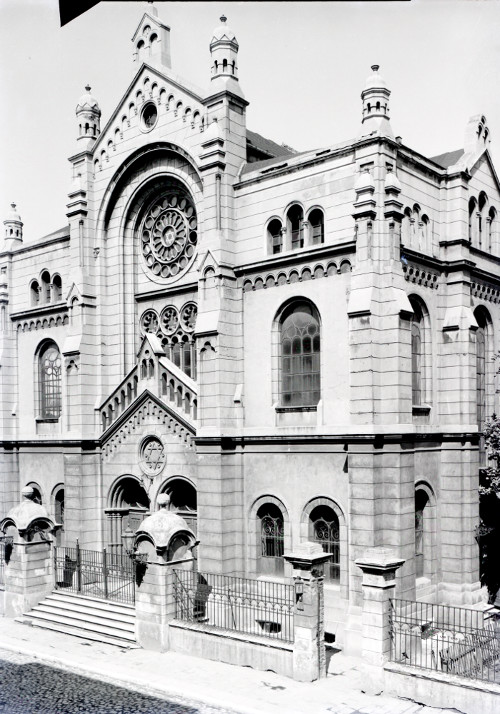
Ezras Israel Synagogue

The beginnings of Jewish settlement in Łódź date back to the 18th century, the period of the fall of the Polish-Lithuanian Commonwealth. The city did not have the de non tolerandis Judaeis privilege. The first known Jewish inhabitants of the city were Daniel Layzerowicz, a baker and Abram Lewkowicz, a tailor. They both lived in Łódź already in 1785. In 1791 Mosiek a.k.a. Mojżesz Pryntz from Lutomiersk settled here. The first wealthy and educated Jews living in Łódź were: Pinkus Zajdler, who came from Przedbórz in 1795, Pinkus Sonenberg, who came in 1797 from Łęczyca, and Lewek Heber, who came to Łódź in 1801 from Lutomiersk. They all played an important role, performing the functions of successive members of the Jewish community.

The influx of Jewish people to the town was not large until the Second Partition of Poland in 1793. Out of a total of 190 inhabitants, only 11 were Jews. It was undoubtedly influenced by the character of the city; it was still the so-called a typical agricultural village, not very attractive to newcomers. The fact that Łódź was the property of the bishop until the Second Partition of Poland was also of great importance for the Jewish settlement; only in the period 1796–1798 it became a government city.

In the years 1818-1817 the Jews of Łódź constituted about a third of the city's inhabitants and most of them were poor. In 1825, German experts were invited to Łódź to help industrialize the city. The Germans signed a treaty called the "Zagirez Treaty" which included restrictions on the Jews. The Jews were required to live in the southern edges of the city, and move to the Jewish quarter within two years, except for two families who received permission to live in another part of the city. This area covered the southern side of the Old Market Square, Wolborska and Podrzeczna Streets up to the Łódka River. The area of the Jewish district was expanded several times: in 1841, the entire Old Town Square was included, Wolborska, Podrzeczna, and Drewnowska Streets, and in 1861, it was extended to the southern and western parts of Kościelny Square, Franciszkańska and Północna Streets.

Although this ban only applied to Zgierz, the authorities by establishing factory settlements: Nowe Miasto and Łódka, they followed suit on the Agreement of Zgierz, therefore settling here handicraftsmen, the vast majority of them Germans, decided that the ban Jewish settlement also includes this area. Reluctant to Jews the attitude of Łódź weavers and craftsmen decided that the first Jewish inhabitant of Nowe Miasto was only left at the end of 1833, Ludwik Mamroth, a wealthy merchant and component of Kalisz, which received permission from the government authorities to establish a yarn warehouse here. The next Jewish entrepreneurs who in the period until 1848 that were allowed to live in or set up a shop or yarn warehouse in Nowe Miasto were: Dawid Lande from Kalisz, Chaim Tykociner from Warsaw, Szmul Saltzman and Jakub Tyński. in total, until 1848, only 8 families lived there Jewish. The breakthrough came after the publication in September 1848 of the which definitely softened the limitations of the 1825 decree, between among others, it reduced by half the value of the property required from candidates wishing to live outside the district (previously PLN 20,000).

In 1836, the Jews began to take an active part in the city's economy. In addition, this year educated Jews came to the city who fought for the dismantling of the ghetto and managed to live in the other part of the city as individuals in various tricks. In 1840 the authorities realized that the boundaries of the Jewish Quarter should be expanded as the number of Jewish residents in the city reached over 1350, but this plan was not approved. The Jews turned to the Russian commissioner and asked for official approval for "retrospective rights", the approval was given after 20 years when there were already about 5,500 Jews in the city. Despite the approval and expansion of the neighbourhood, the place was still crowded and the municipality did not allow more Jews to settle in the city, expelling Jews who were not permanent.

The end and the various restrictions on the Jews were in 1862 with the advent of the reform initiated by Prince Wielopowski, the liberal constitution - the emancipation of all the inhabitants of Poland and then the ghetto was also abolished and the Jews were released from the Treaty of Ziegler and the German Custodian. At the beginning of the reform, the Poles and Germans boycotted Jews who rented houses and evicted them from the common well, but later realized that cooperation with the Jews was economically viable for them. The Jews lived mainly in the center of Łódź, where there was also a Jewish character. The Jews who lived far from the center of Łódź were more involved with the Germans and Poles. After the ghetto was abolished, there was a great change among the Jews. The old wooden houses have disappeared and magnificent stone houses have been erected in their place. In addition the educated and merchants moved to more distant streets and established a branch trade. During this period there were wars between the old and the new between the educated and the Hasidim. In 1870 there were about 10,000 Jews in Łódź and in 1897 there were about 98,000 Jews. In 1809 the first synagogue was established and in 1811 land was purchased for the Jewish cemetery and thus the Jewish community of the city became an independent community independent of the communities around it. The Jews contributed greatly to the city's economy.

=== World War I ===
World War I caused a drastic decline in the number of Jews in Łódź, even before the Germans occupied the city. From the outbreak of World War I until the conquest of the city on December 6, 1914, about 50,000 Jews left the city. Their number dropped from 200,000 Jews on the eve of the war to less than 150,000. The Jews who fled the city for fear of being occupied by the Germans flowed east or into the surrounding villages. With the outbreak of the war, industrial production greatly diminished. There was a stagnation in trade and the financial market. The employment of the workers, and the Jewish workers among them, fell sharply. To deal with the famine, morbidity and mortality that were a result of the war, the community initiated mutual aid operations. With the help of the JDC, productive and consumer cooperatives were established and the activities of charities were expanded.

=== Second Polish Republic ===
In the Interwar period, during the existence of the Second Polish Republic, the Łódź community was active not only in the field of education but also in the broader field of culture and various ideological movements: books were published in Hebrew and Yiddish, mainly in the fields of rabbinic literature, commentary and Hasidism, but also poetry and prose files. The most famous Łódź poet was Itzhak Katzenelson, who lived in Łódź from 1896 to 1939 when he escaped the city. He founded the Habima Theatre in Łódź. In 1939, with the outbreak of World War II, he fled to Warsaw. He devoted himself to literary activity in the Warsaw ghetto and even led a dramatic troupe in the ghetto. In 1943 he was sent to the Vital detention camp in France, and from there to Auschwitz, where he was murdered. In addition, daily newspapers, weekly magazines and periodicals in Yiddish and Hebrew appeared in Łódź.

=== World War II and the Holocaust ===
After September 1, the Jewish community in the city continued its regular activities. On the first day of the war, the community board, led by Chairman Jakub Leib Mincberg, visited the Voivodship Office headquarters. There, in the presence of Chief Stanisław Wrona, Mincberg issued a declaration expressing the community's willingness to cooperate with state and social authorities on behalf of the entire Jewish population.

The following day, Henryk Mostowski, the town’s Starosta, informed the community of an attachment order for its premises at 18 Pomorska Street, though the intended use of the building by the authorities remained unclear. On September 3, the community's management issued a letter to all departments, offices, and institutions of the community. In light of the new wartime conditions, the letter recommended implementing strict cost-saving measures and rational administration. It also requested that within two days, proposals be submitted for the suspension or termination of non-essential operations.

On September 4, responding to new restrictions on vehicle movement imposed by city authorities, the Jewish Community Board submitted a request to the Military Department of the City Administration (Polish: Wydział Wojskowy Zarządu Miejskiego). The request, signed by Chairman Mincberg and Secretary Pinkus Nadel, asked for permits allowing four funeral caravans to transport the deceased to the cemetery without restriction.

Despite Mincberg’s escape from Łódź to Vilnius and the increasingly difficult conditions in the city, the community's operations remained functional, albeit at a slower pace. In the following days, the board continued routine activities, including sending letters to the Civil Registry Office requesting the registration of births. The board also organized aid for refugees wounded in German air raids. On September 8, the body of Dr. Jakub Schlosser was brought in for burial.

On October 5, 1939, SA-Obergruppenführer Adolf-Heinz Beckerle, commander of the Łódź police, imposed compulsory labour on the Jewish population. Six days later, Jewish doctors were dismissed from school positions. An order from the Head of the Civil Administration Harry von Craushaar required the Łódź Jewish Community to supply 700 workers daily, later increased to 2,000, without pay was to normalize and legalize the forced labour work of the Jewish people. However, this did not stop the practice of catching and forcing Jews to humiliating works in private Volksdeutsche apartments German soldiers frequently mocked, humiliated, and beat Jewish labourers on the streets.

On October 13, Civil Commissioner Albert Leister appointed Chaim Rumkowski as the Älteste der Juden in Litzmannstadt (Eldest of the Jews in Łódź). The existing Jewish Community Board was dissolved. On October 18, Leister ordered Rumkowski to dismiss all Polish teachers from Jewish schools, with prior notice and compensation. That same week, the Border Guard’s Middle Sector Command banned Jews from trading in raw materials, textiles, leather, and footwear. Jewish shoemakers were forbidden from making new shoes.

On October 31, Beckerle issued a bilingual German-Polish proclamation blaming food shortages and high prices on alleged Jewish profiteering. The order also required Jewish shops to display signs marking their ownership, such as “Jüdisches Geschäft” (Jewish Business) which fuelled a wave of looting and vandalism.

On November 1, police raided the "Astoria" café on the corner of Piotrkowska and Więckowskiego Streets, arresting dozens of Jewish intellectuals—writers, actors, and artists who were tortured to extract ransom money. On November 2, 15 Jews from outside Łódź were executed in the Łagiewniki Forest. Those who could not pay were sent to the Radogoszcz camp.

On November 4, Jewish bakers were banned from making or selling any bread other than a restricted type. On November 7, Jews were prohibited from walking in Piotrkowska Street. Then, on November 11, the Gestapo arrested nearly the entire 30-member Jewish Council of Elders. Ten were later released; the others were either executed or deported to concentration camps.

On November 14, Friedrich Uebelhoer, president of the Łódź District, issued an order requiring Jews, regardless of age and gender to wear a 10-centimeter-wide armband with a yellow Jewish star on their right shoulder, directly under the armpit. Those who refused to comply with this order faced the death penalty. On December 11 Governor of Warta Country Arthur Greiser changed this ordinance to the obligation to wear a Star of David on the right side of the chest and on the back. Jews were also forbidden to leave their homes between 17:00 and 8:00.

==== Łódź Ghetto ====
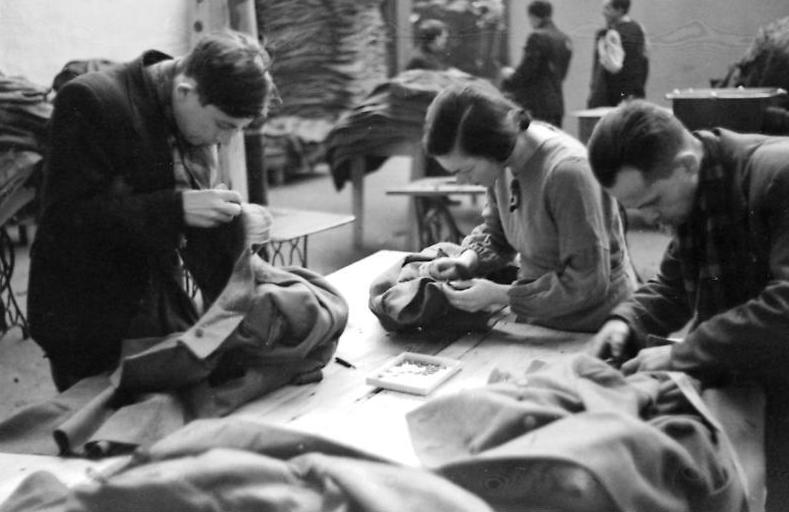
Jews clean and repair coats salvaged at Chełmno for redistribution among Volksdeutsche in accordance with the top secret August Frank memorandum. The yellow badge was removed.

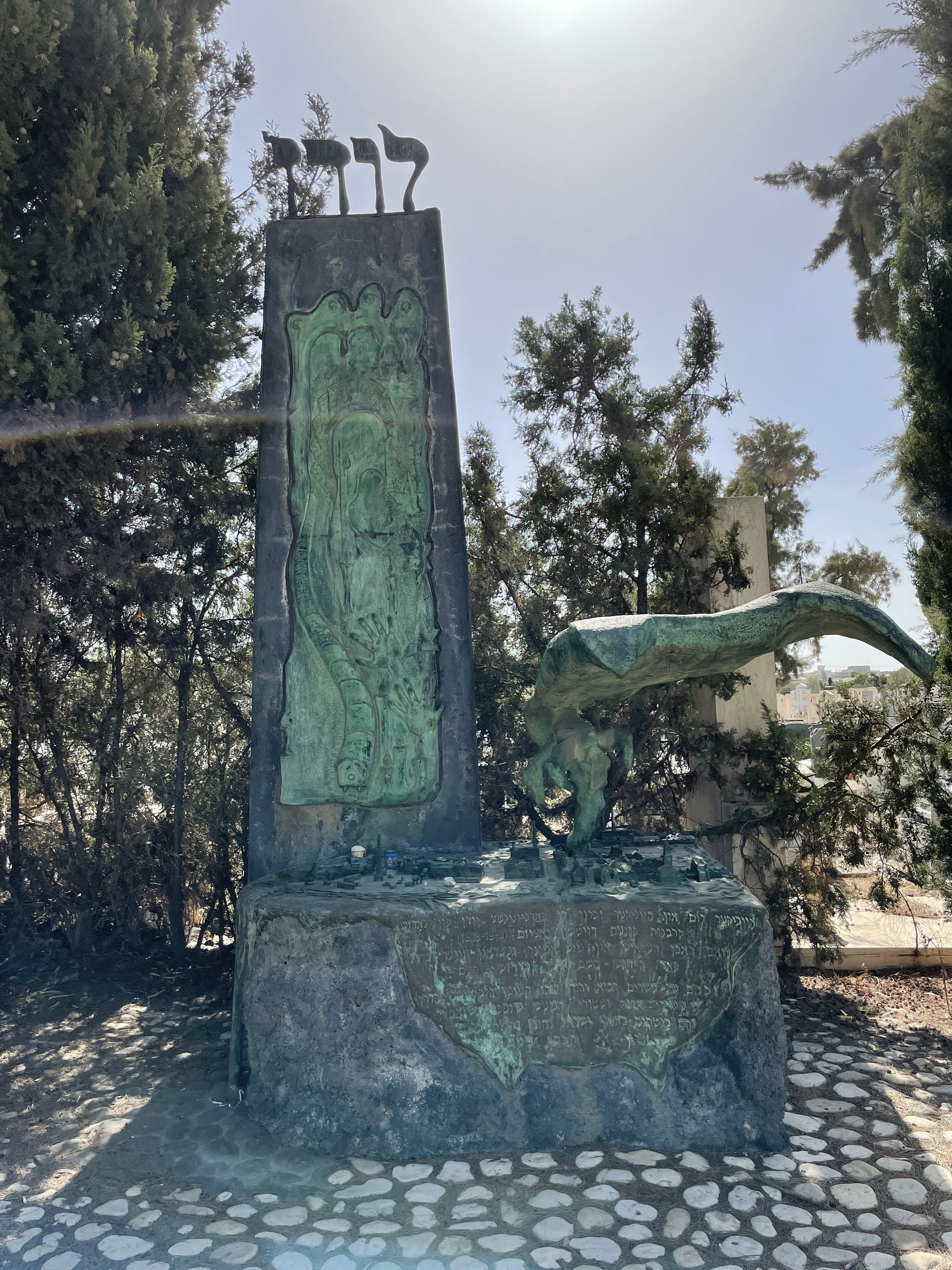
Lodz Holocaust memorial, Holon cemetery, Israel

The ghetto was officially demarcated on February 8, 1940, and was the first to be built by the Nazis and the last to be destroyed. Its area was less than 4 square kilometres, most streets had no sewers. To speed up the transition to the Nazi ghetto, a pogrom was carried out on March 1, during which many Jews were killed, and on April 30 the ghetto was closed to 164,000 Jews. The inhabitants of the ghetto suffered from hunger, and soon the inhabitants were left without means of subsistence, which led to demonstrations and riots, the situation improved somewhat after the establishment of production plants for the needs of Germany. In August 1942, 91 ghetto factories employed about 78,000 workers. About 15,000 people were sent to labor camps, only a few returned, and for many years there were periods when Germans brought remnants from various communities to the ghetto, which increased Residents suffered from famine, overcrowding and sanitation that caused epidemics, typhus and tuberculosis, and Rumkowski created a network designed to meet the needs of the population between 1940 and 1942, headed 7 hospitals, five pharmacies, an education department with 47 schools, a food department, a welfare department, nursing homes, dormitories, courts, and prisons, etc. Jewish police maintained order in the ghetto, but handed over deportations and recruitment to forced labor and even confiscated Jewish property, some opposed to Rumkowski.

=== People's Republic of Poland ===
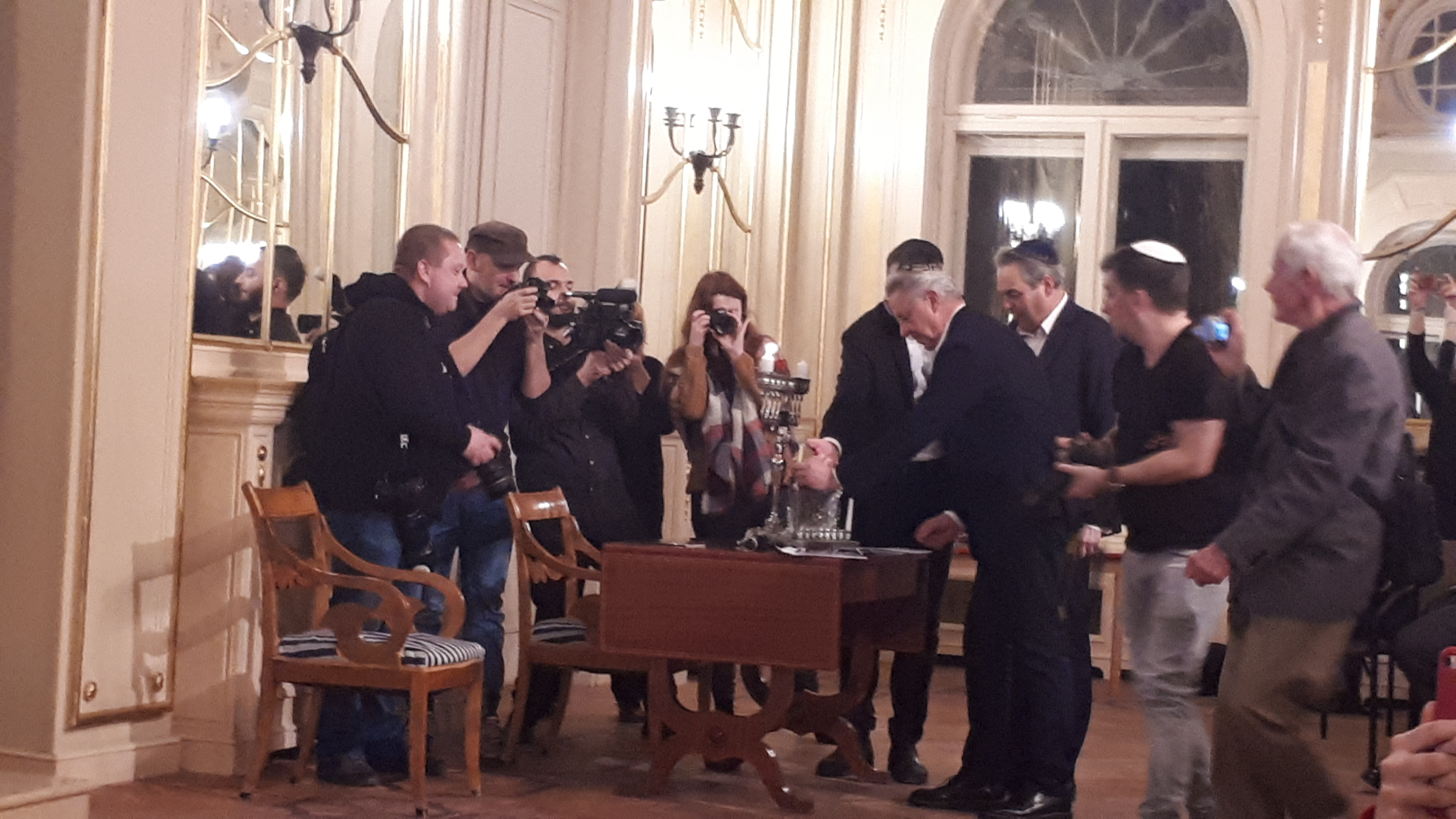
Hanukkah candles-lighting ceremony in Izrael Poznański Palace by Rabbi Dawid Szychowski

In 1945 following the end of the Holocaust a new period in the history of the city's Jews began. In the first years after World War II, when Warsaw had not yet been rebuilt from its ruins, Łódź actually served as the capital of Poland due to its central location in Poland and due to the fact that the city itself, compared to Warsaw, was not destroyed. Therefore, in 1945–1948, the Polish authorities and its central institutions were located in Łódź. For the same reason, the Jewish community in Łódź was extremely important in Poland, both quantitatively, organizationally and institutionally. After the Kielce pogrom, and the Anti-Jewish violence in Poland in 1944–1946 nearly half of the Jews of Łódź left Poland.

Already at the end of 1945 there were between 24,000 and 27,000 Jews in the city. At the end of the 1940s the number of Jews in Łódź was estimated at 15,000 to 20,000 with 5,000 people leaving legally for Israel in the following months. At the threshold of the 1950s there were 10,000 to 15,000 Jews left in the city, with many of them barely emphasizing their national identity. The Jews lived mainly in the central area of the city along the streets Narutowicza, Zielona, Zermoskiego, Obrońców Stalingradu (now Legionów), Pomorska and Kilińskiego.

The post-war years were active in terms of social, political and cultural life, though it didn't match the levels of the pre-war period. There were number of organizational activities in the city, though those organizations differ from the ones that existed before the war. Already on 11 February 1945 the Provincial Jewish Committee (Polish: Wojewódzki Komitet Żydowski) of the Central Committee of Polish Jews began operating with Michał Mirski as its leader. The committee had its offices at 32 Więckowskiego street, and its main role was to rehabilitate the Sh'erit ha-Pletah, including housing, clothing, food, work, medical assistance, assistance in finding relatives and family reunification. The main source of aid was the JDC, which resumed operations in Poland in September 1946, and the TAZ. Other organizations and resources included the Society of Jewish People's Health Protection (TOZ) and the Children's Home in Helenówek managed by Maria Fajngold (Falkowka), dormitory at 15 Franciszkańska street and Repatriates' Home at 16 Jakuba street as well as TOZ hospital at 30 Piłsudsiego street a theater, two schools and about 20 newspapers and magazines in Yiddish, Hebrew and Polish.

Politically, a number of parties, political organizations and union existed. Some of them were Zionist, such as Poalei Syon Lewica, Poalei Syon Prawica and Ihud while others were not, such as the Bund. As the political environment deteriorated with the consolidation of power by the Polish United Workers' Party, three were tolerated by the authorities: Aguda, Jewish Democratic Party (Polish: Żydowskie Stronnictwo Demokratyczne) and the Zionist-Revisionists. Among the activists of the Jewish parties were Aron Cyncynatus, Gerszon Fogl, Stefan Grajek, Izaak Najter, Szymon Rogoziński, Abram Kagan and Józef Rotenbuerg.

The religious community was established in 1945 under new laws first as religious society (Polish: zydowskie zrzeszenie wyznaniow) and one year later it was changed to a congregation (Polish: kongregacji). It was led by Józef Atlas shortly after he was joined by Abram Krawiec who was the first rabbi in Lodz since the liberation. Zew Wawa Morejno worked parallel to him. The congregation leadership represented 3 major political movements: Aguda, Mizrachi and the General Zionists. The congregation had its synagogue at 28 Południowa street and a house of prayer at 66 Zachodnia street. Also Jewish schools opened, one of them at 49 Kilińskiego street and another at 13 Więckowskiego street.

At the end of the 40s and beginning of the 50s the communist authorities began tightening the screws. By the end of 1949 most of the organizations and institutions were shut down. In October 1950 A new government-controlled organization was formed Social-Cultural Society of Jews in Poland (TSKŻ). Following October Thaw activity increased on the one hand, but a massive exodus of Jews to Israel occurred on the other hand. In the first half of the 60s there wee around 2,000 to 3,000 Jews in the city. In that period the Łódź branch of TSKŻ moved to 13 Więckowskiego street. Literary evenings and artistic events took place and meetings with Jewish writers and artist were organized as well as Jewish press and books distributed.

The Anti-semitic campaign of 1968 sharply affected the situation of the Jews in the city. Many Jews were fire and lost their positions. The events led to massive exodus with more than thousand Jews leaving to Israel. By the early 1970s the community had less than a thousand people. Most of the board of the Łódź office of TSKŻ emigrated from Poland and the religious congregation almost phased out. In February 1972 the Jews in the city managed to appoint a new board to the regional branch of the TSKŻ. In 1975 the municipal authorities ordered to move the TSKZ Łódź branch to 4 Wolczanska street where the community had its auditorium, buffe and television room. In 1989, the Łódź community had 60 members.

=== Modern Poland ===
Following the end of Communism in Poland in 1989-1990 and the political reforms that followed it, the community's situation began improving. In 1997, the community regained the Gebhardt Palace at Pomorska street – the pre-war seat of the community. In 1998, a synagogue was established in one of the community buildings, currently the most frequently used one; the second is the Reicher Synagogue (at 28 Rewolucji 1905 roku street ). In 2008, a mikveh was opened.

== Gallery ==
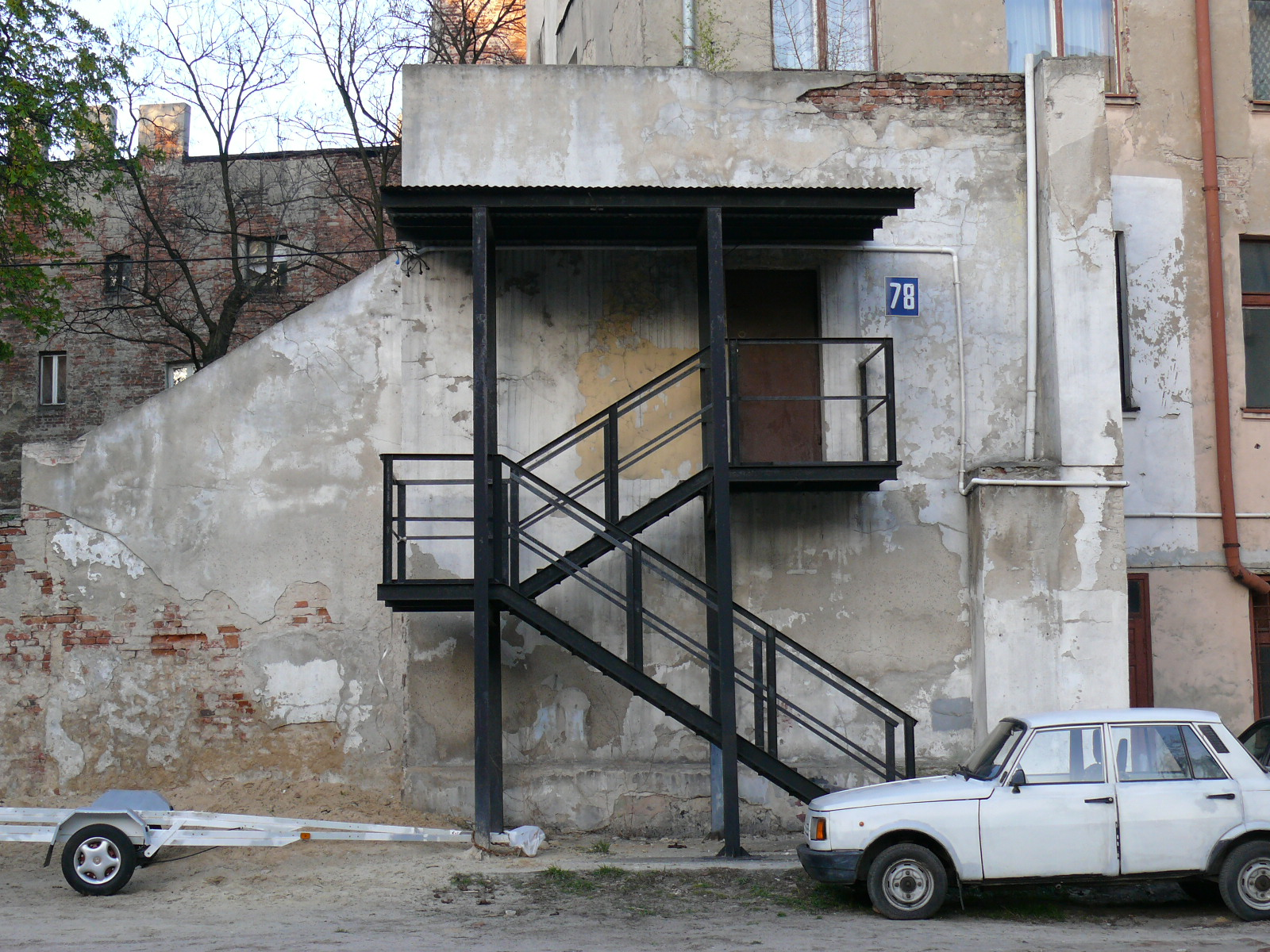
Former office and apartment of Zew Wawa Morejno, 78 Zachodnia in Łódź

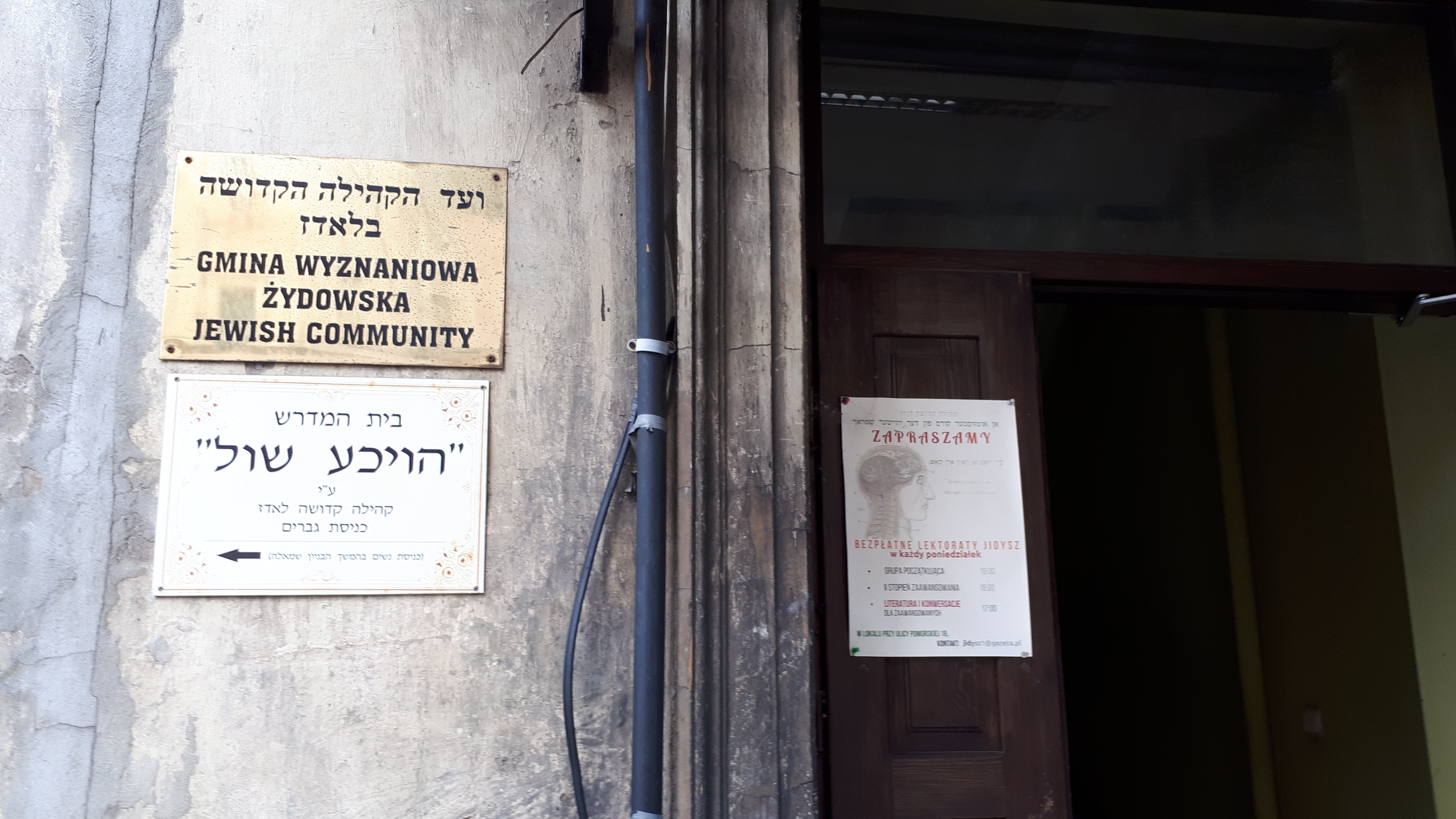
Current office of the Jewish community board of Łódź in 18 Pomorska Street

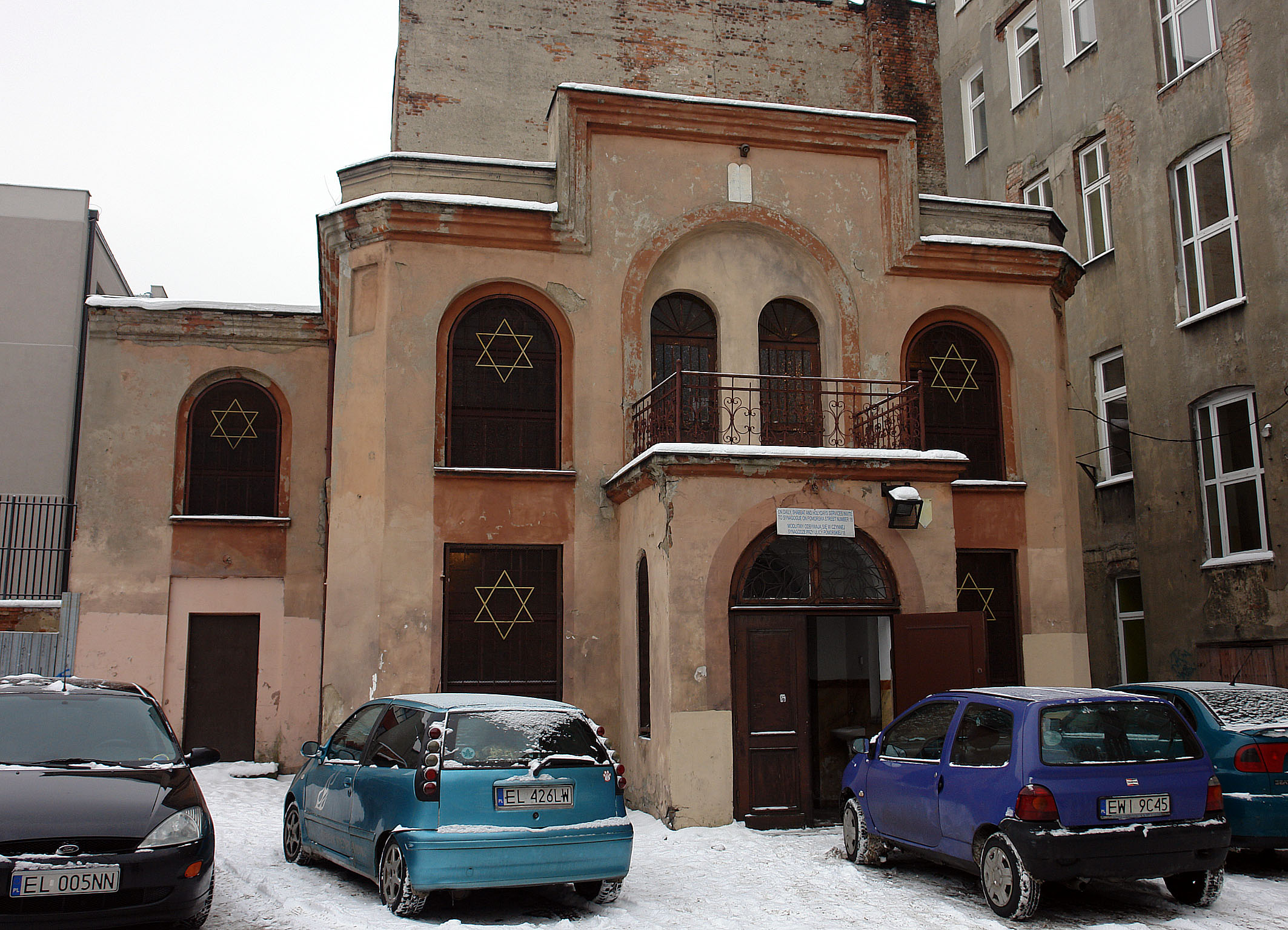
Reicher Synagogue

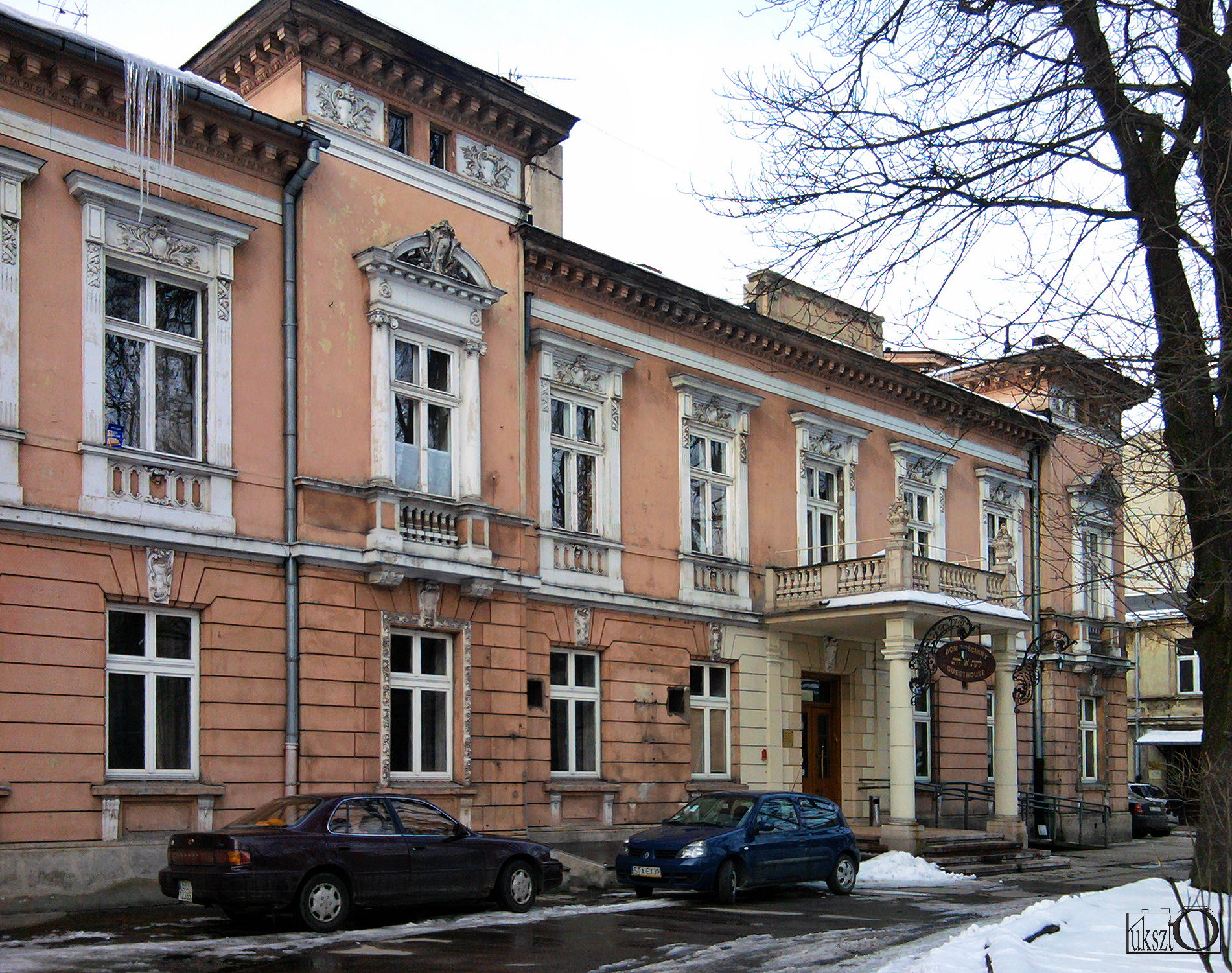
Jewish Community Center, Karol Gebhardt House located in 18 Pomorska Street

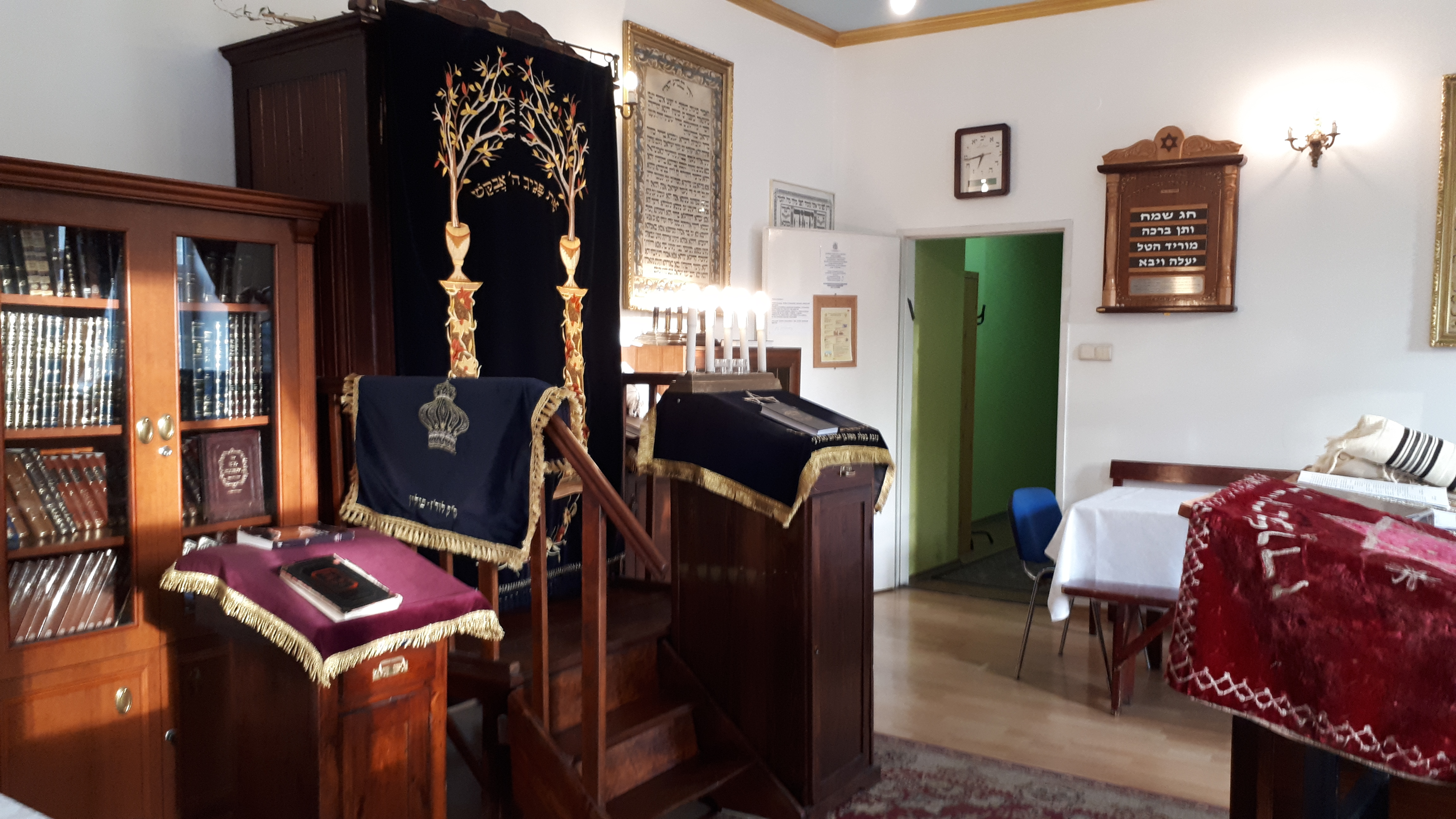
Synagogue in 18 Pomorska Street

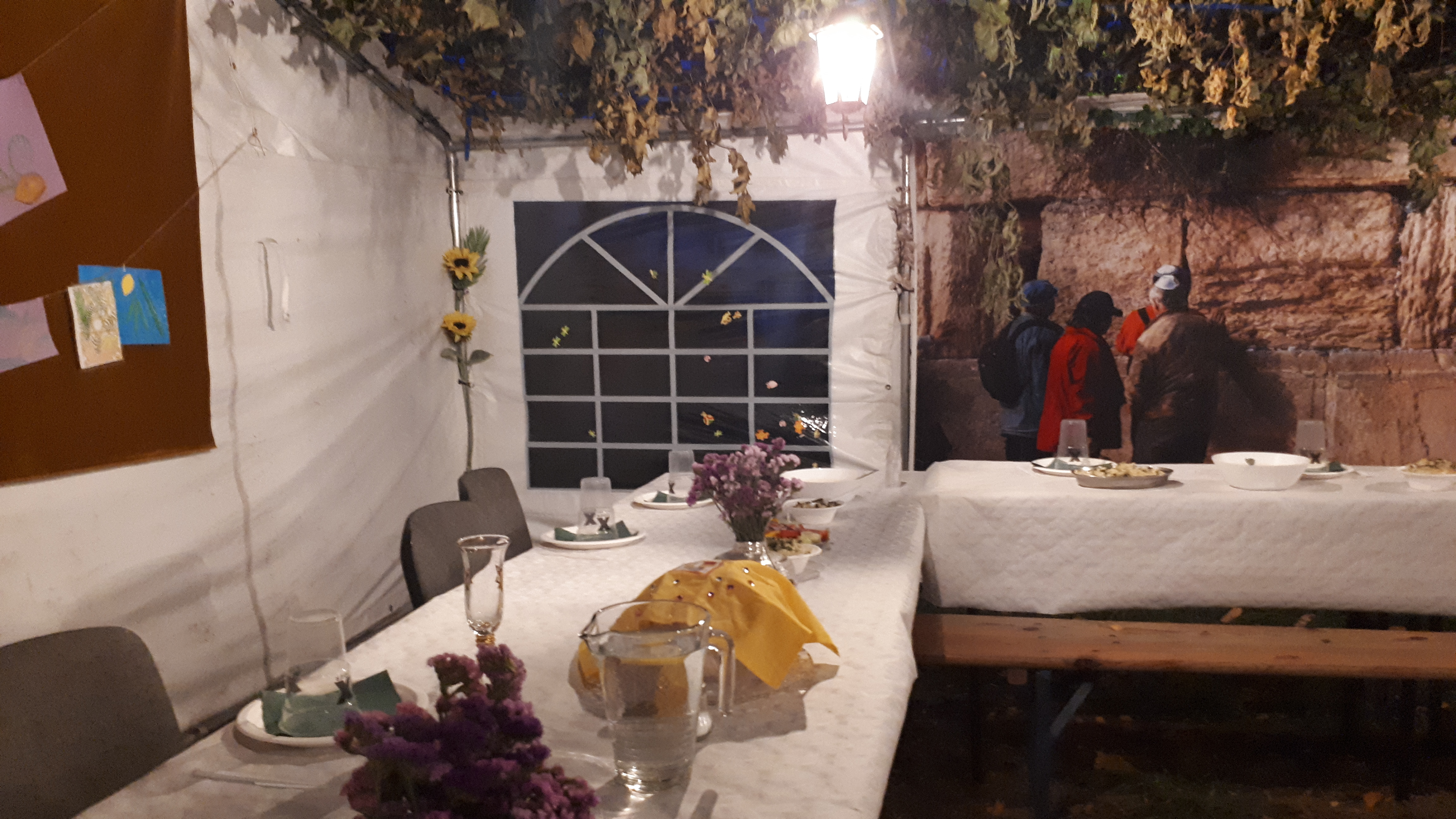
Sukkot in the Jewish community center

== See also ==
- History of Łódź
- History of the Jews in Białystok
- The Holocaust in Poland
- Antisemitism in Poland
- Kinder KZ
- Jewish-Polish history (1989–present)
- Rescue of Jews by Poles during the Holocaust
