= Karol Anstadt Avenue, Łódź =

Avenue in Łódź, Poland

Karol Anstadt Avenue
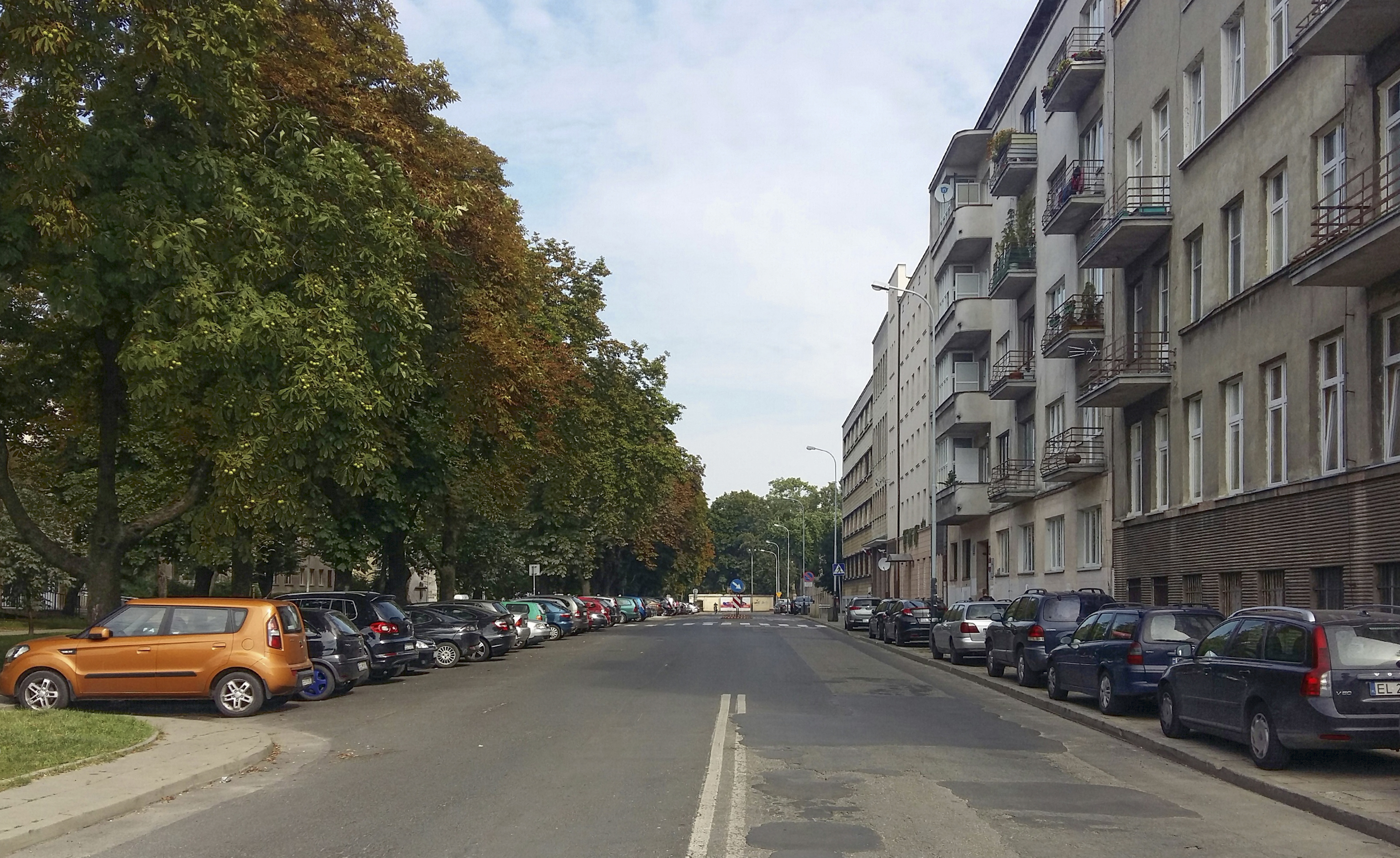
- View of the avenue from Pomorska Street

- Location within Poland
- Part of: Fabryczna
- Length: 200 m (660 ft)
- Location: Łódź, Poland
- Coordinates: 51°46′45.5″N 19°28′15.5″E

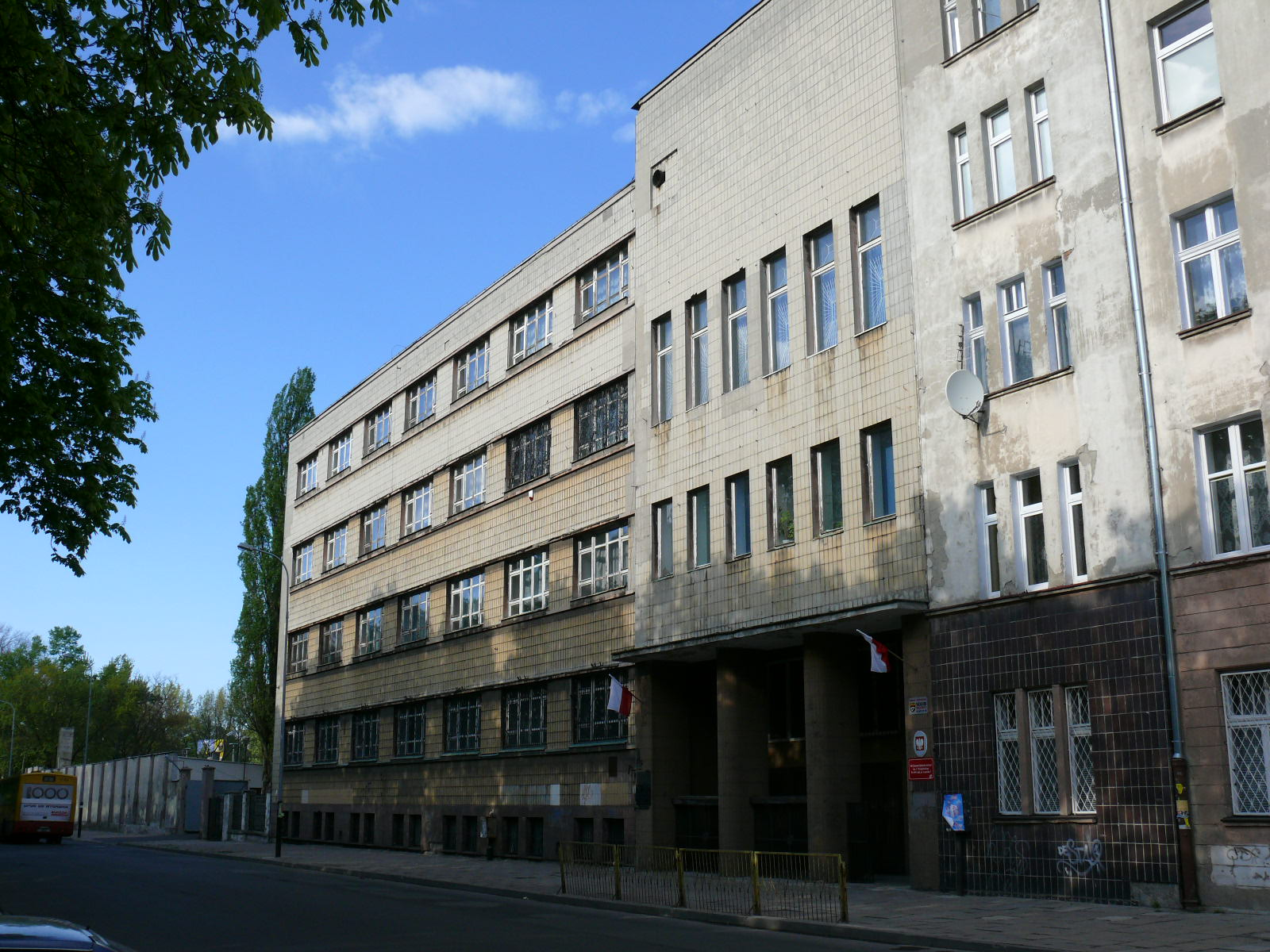
Building at 7 Karol Anstadt Avenue has housed the Stanisław Wyspiański XII High School since 1979

Karol Anstadt Avenue (Polish: Aleja Karola Anstadta) is a short, approximately 200-meter-long street located in the northern part of Łódź's Śródmieście district, within the Fabryczna area. It connects Pomorska Street to Północna Street and leads directly to Helenów Park, a historic park established in the 1880s by the Anstadt family. The avenue is named after Carl Gottlob Anstadt, a 19th-century Łódź entrepreneur and founder of nearby landmarks, including a brewery.

The avenue supports two-way traffic with a single lane in each direction. It is designated as a municipal road and is a one-lane street throughout its length.

The avenue falls under the jurisdiction of the Roman Catholic Parish of the Blessed Virgin Mary, Queen of Peace.

== History ==
=== 1885–1939 ===
The Karol Anstadt Avenue, measuring 210 meters in length, was likely established as a private road between 1885 and 1890. It is absent from the February 1887 list of Łódź streets but appears unnamed on a map of the city layout circa 1890. The avenue was designed to provide easier access to the private Helenów Park, opened to the public by the Anstadt family on 26 January 1885. At that time, it was impossible to access the park from the city center via Północna Street, as just after the intersection with the former Widzewska Street (now Jan Kiliński Street), the street passed through private land owned by Robert Biedermann, who did not consent to the opening of the street. (Note: Between 1881 and 1888, a civil lawsuit with mutual claims took place between Robert Biedermann and the city authorities, along with the successors of Karol Anstadt, who sought to unblock Północna Street. On 30 December 1882, the district court issued a favorable ruling for Biedermann, meaning the section of Północna Street remained closed as it ran through private land. On 30 December 1885, the Warsaw court chamber upheld the Piotrków district court's ruling, modifying only the section concerning compensation for damages and losses. In early 1888, the St. Petersburg cassation department of the senate confirmed the decision of the court chamber.) Therefore, the Anstadt family decided to route the avenue through their own land, from the former Średnia Street (now Pomorska Street) to Północna Street, near the park entrance, thus bypassing the enclosed section of Północna Street.

The avenue first appears unnamed on Władysław Starzyński's 1894–1896 map. It received the name Karol Anstadt Street likely in 1909 or 1910. The street remained unnamed on the 1903 city plan by Eugeniusz Starczewski and the 1909 plan created for the construction of the city's sewage network. However, the 1910 city map published by Robert Resiger, as part of the 1911 calendar Czas, shows the street under the name Ansztadt Street.

On 23 December 1898, the first tram, a Herbrand VNB-125 with a first-class trailer from the Petersburg Wagon Construction Society (the so-called "Petersburg type"), ran along what was still an unnamed street, marking the beginning of tram service in Łódź. The tram started at 1:00 PM from the depot on Nowo-Wysoka Street (now Tramwajowa Street), following a route that passed through Dzielna Street (now President Gabriel Narutowicz Street), Piotrkowska Street, New Market (now Liberty Square), Średnia Street (now Pomorska Street), and the unnamed avenue (now Karol Anstadt Avenue) to Helenów Park. From there, the tram turned onto Północna Street, then went back along Targowa Street (now Seweryn Sterling Street) to Średnia Street, before continuing to Piotrkowska Street, returning to the depot and the Paradyż Theatre. Regular tram service on the avenue began three days later with Line 3, which was replaced on 28 January 1899 by Line 4. This line is referenced in Julian Tuwim's poem Kwiaty polskie (Polish Flowers): Zieloną czwórką się dojedzie / Do zielonego Helenowa (On the Green Four, one will reach / The Green Helenów). (Note: Line 4 was designated with the color green.) On 3 August 1900, Line 5 was added.

During World War I, under the German occupation of Łódź, the street was renamed Anstadtstraße in German. After Poland regained independence, the street name was restored to Polish, and the designation was changed from ulica (street) to aleja (avenue), officially becoming Karol Anstadt Avenue in 1918.

Tram service along Karol Anstadt Avenue continued until 22 September 1928, with the last tram of Line 4 going to Helenów Park. The track remained at least until 1942.

=== 1939–1945 ===
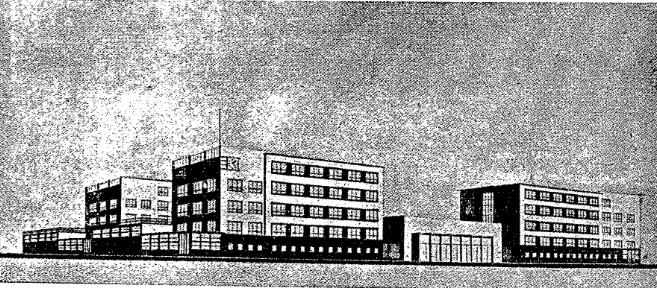
Buildings of the Jewish Schools Society in Łódź at 7 Karol Anstadt Avenue were featured in an illustration published in Głos Gminy Żydowskiej in 1938

In August 1939, the construction of a modernist building at 7 Karol Anstadt Avenue was completed. This building was intended to house the Men's Gymnasium of the Jewish Secondary School Society in Łódź, with classes scheduled to begin on 1 September 1939. However, following the German occupation of the city, the building was seized by the Nazis on 9 September 1939. The next day, the 2nd unit of the III Special Operational Group of the Security Police (Einsatzgruppe III Sicherheitspolizei), commanded by SS-Sturmbannführer Fritz Liphardt, arrived in Łódź and was stationed in the school building. On 7 November 1939, the building was converted into a local Gestapo office, with Gerhard Flesch serving as its first head (later succeeded by Robert Schefe and Otto Bradfisch). The basement was converted into a detention center, and garages and storage facilities were set up on the adjacent plot along Północna Street. The Gestapo personnel (who numbered 151 officers in the summer of 1944) resided in nearby buildings. The access to the avenue was blocked on both sides by German checkpoints. In 1944, Jan Lipsz, codenamed Anatol, a baker from Zduńska Wola and a member of the Union of Armed Struggle, was likely executed during an investigation at the Gestapo headquarters. The Gestapo office remained operational until the end of the German occupation of the city, and a commemorative plaque now adorns the front wall of the building in remembrance of these events.

During the German occupation, the avenue itself was renamed Anstadtallee in 1940 and later changed to Gardestraße after the city's name was altered to Litzmannstadt in the same year.

=== 1945–1989 ===
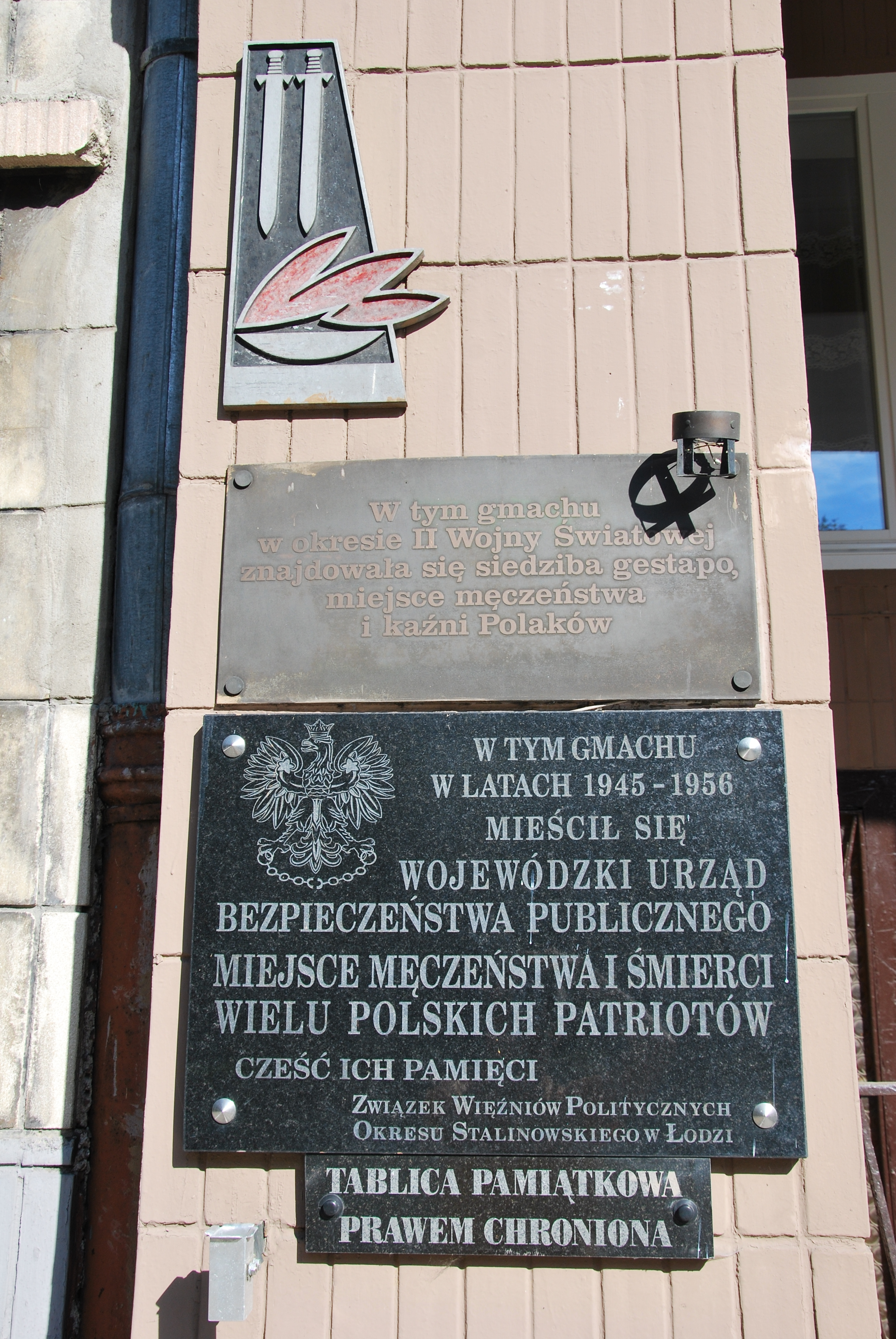
Commemorative plaques on the front wall of the building of XII High School

After World War II, the name Karol Anstadt Avenue was temporarily reinstated. On 19 January 1946, during a ceremonial session of the National Council at the Theater of the Polish Army, commemorating the first anniversary of Łódź's liberation from German occupation, a proposal to rename the street was unanimously accepted. The name was changed to 19 Stycznia Street, commemorating the date of the city's liberation by the Red Army in 1945. This name was already in use on a city map published in 1948.

On 20 January 1945, Colonel Mieczysław Moczar, accompanied by 94 officers of the Security Office from Białystok, arrived in Łódź. The former Gestapo building at 7 19 Stycznia Street became the headquarters of the Łódź Provincial Office of Public Security, with Moczar serving as the head of the office from 23 January 1945 to 1948, followed by other directors, including Colonel Czesław Borecki. The building's basement was converted into a detention center, where several individuals were imprisoned, tortured, and executed. Among those executed were:

- Czesław Stachura, an officer of the Office of Public Security in Łódź. He secretly provided members of the Freedom and Independence Association with intelligence regarding ongoing investigations and repressive actions against the Konspiracyjne Wojsko Polskie. He was arrested on 16 November 1946 and executed on 14 January 1947.
- Zbigniew Zakrzewski, codenamed Bryła, a Home Army activist, deputy president of the Łódź District Board of Freedom and Independence Association, and organizer of an intelligence network in the region. He was arrested on 17 November 1946 and executed on 26 March 1947. (Note: Joanna Żelazko states that Zbigniew Zakrzewski was executed in December 1947.)
- Stanisław Malicki, an employee of the Office of Public Security in Łódź, proven to have provided intelligence to soldiers under Major Adam Trybus and collaborated with the anti-communist underground. He was arrested in 1951 and executed on 18 April 1952.

At 7 19 Stycznia Street, Stanisław Sojczyński was imprisoned and tortured in 1946, and between 1950 and 1951, Father Tomasz Rostworowski, a chaplain for academic youth in Łódź, became a detainee at the local detention center. The Provincial Office of Public Security operated in Łódź until 1956. A plaque on the building's front wall commemorates the work of the office and the victims of its officers. The memories of a seven-month stay at the detention center were shared in the autobiography Wczasy w Anstadta Zdrój (2014) by Professor Edward Kącki, rector of the Łódź University of Information Technology.

Additionally, from January 1946, the building at number 10 housed the first headquarters of the City Public Security Office, which was later moved to 26 Henryk Sienkiewicz Street.

In 1959, the building at 7 19 Stycznia Street was handed over to educational authorities. Initially, it housed Primary School No. 98, and in 1979, it became the location of the Stanisław Wyspiański XII Secondary School.

On 8 August 1984, after nearly 56 years, public transport returned to 19 Stycznia Street, with bus line 57 running (without stops) from Kurak toward the Northern bus station. Buses were withdrawn after one month, but they returned on 1 July 1997.

=== From 1989 onwards ===
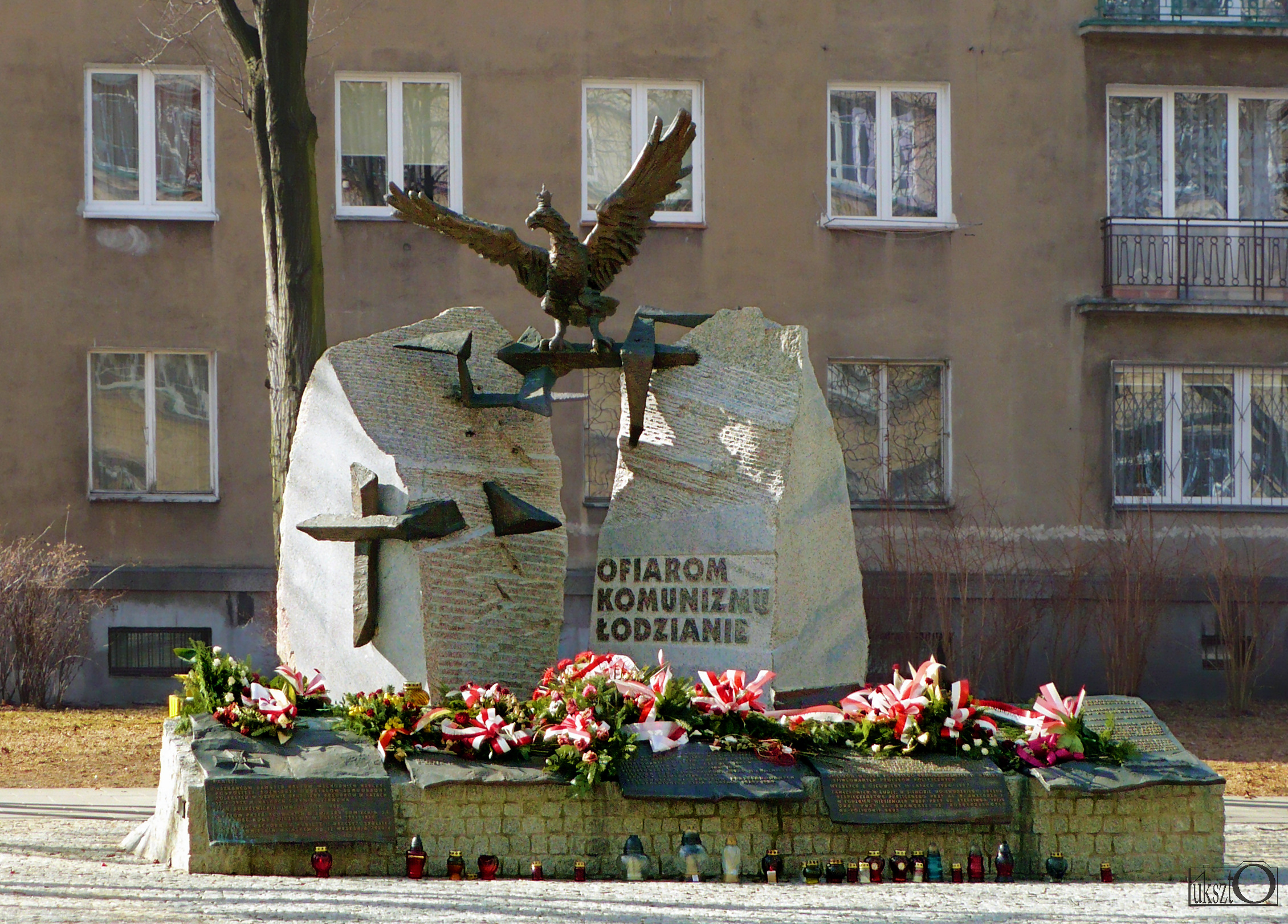
Monument to the Victims of Communism by Wojciech Gryniewicz

On 27 May 1994, the City Council of Łódź passed a resolution (Resolution No. LXXVI/719/94) renaming 19 Stycznia Street to Karol Anstadt Avenue, thus restoring the name used during the interwar period and in 1945.

On 12 July 2007, the City Council of Łódź passed a resolution to erect a Monument to the Victims of Communism, to commemorate the Polish citizens who suffered under the totalitarian communist regime between 1919 and 1989. The monument, designed by Wojciech Gryniewicz, was unveiled on 12 December 2009. It was placed in front of the former Provincial Public Security Office building in Łódź, becoming the first monument in Poland dedicated to the victims of communist repression. The monument hosts ceremonies and demonstrations to commemorate the victims of these repressions, including those on the anniversaries of the Soviet invasion of Poland, National Day of Remembrance for the "Cursed Soldiers", and the anniversary of the introduction of martial law in Poland.

In terms of road safety, the avenue was considered completely safe from 2011 to 2013, with no accidents reported during that period.

In the spring of 2017, city buses (lines 85A and 85B) were rerouted through the avenue, and less than a year later, bus line 57 returned as well.

In October 2018, it was announced that the Institute of National Remembrance and the Institute of Archaeology of the University of Łódź planned archaeological research in the courtyards of properties numbered 7 and 9, as well as neighboring properties. This area had previously housed the Gestapo complex (1939–1945) and the Provincial Public Security Office (1945–1956). Institute of National Remembrance's plans also included conducting interviews with living witnesses to the events from 1945 to 1959. The research was scheduled to begin in April 2019.

Archaeological studies, conducted in June and July 2019 by Institute of National Remembrance's archaeologists, anthropologists, and historians with financial support from the Łódź Special Economic Zone, led to the discovery of what appeared to be a post-German hydro-technical installation, a Faraday cage, Yiddish books, manuscripts (including partially burned German-language documents), school teaching aids, ceramic vessels from the period of the Protectorate of Bohemia and Moravia, and cracks with traces of lime. In the same period, ethnologists conducted nearly 30 interviews with surviving witnesses, including individuals interrogated by the Gestapo and the Office of Public Security, as well as local residents.

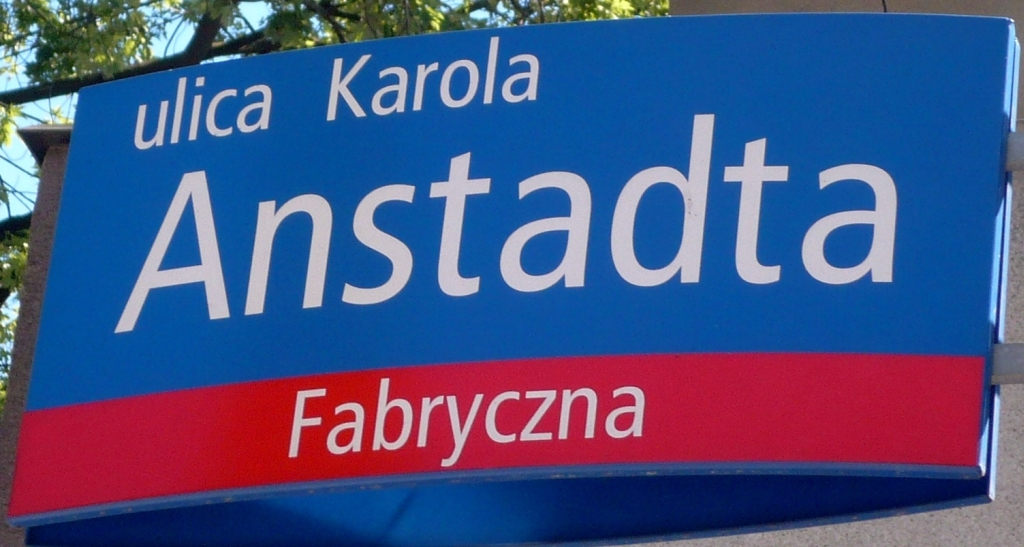
City Information System plaque in Łódź with an incorrect description ("street" instead of "avenue")

=== Chronology of street name changes ===
Period of validity	Street name
Before 1909–1910	Unnamed
1910–1915	Karol Anstadt Street
1915–1918	Anstadtstraße
1918–1940	Karol Anstadt Avenue
1940	Anstadtallee
1940–1945	Gardestraße
1945–1946	Karol Anstadt Avenue
1946–1994	19 Stycznia Street
Since 1994	Karol Anstadt Avenue

== Karol Anstadt Avenue in film ==
Karol Anstadt Avenue (then under the name 19 Stycznia Street) was featured in the TV series Niewiarygodne przygody Marka Piegusa (Incredible Adventures of Marek Piegus, 1966), directed by Mieczysław Waśkowski. In the opening of episode 3 (The Third Adventure: The Unbelievable Pile-Up Around the 'Flaszka' Operation), the intersection of Północna and 19 Stycznia streets is visible.

== Numbering and postal codes ==
- Even numbers: 4–12/14
- Odd numbers: 1–9
- Postal code: 91-409 (for the entire area)
