= Jan Nowak-Jeziorański Bench =

Sculpture in Warsaw, Poland

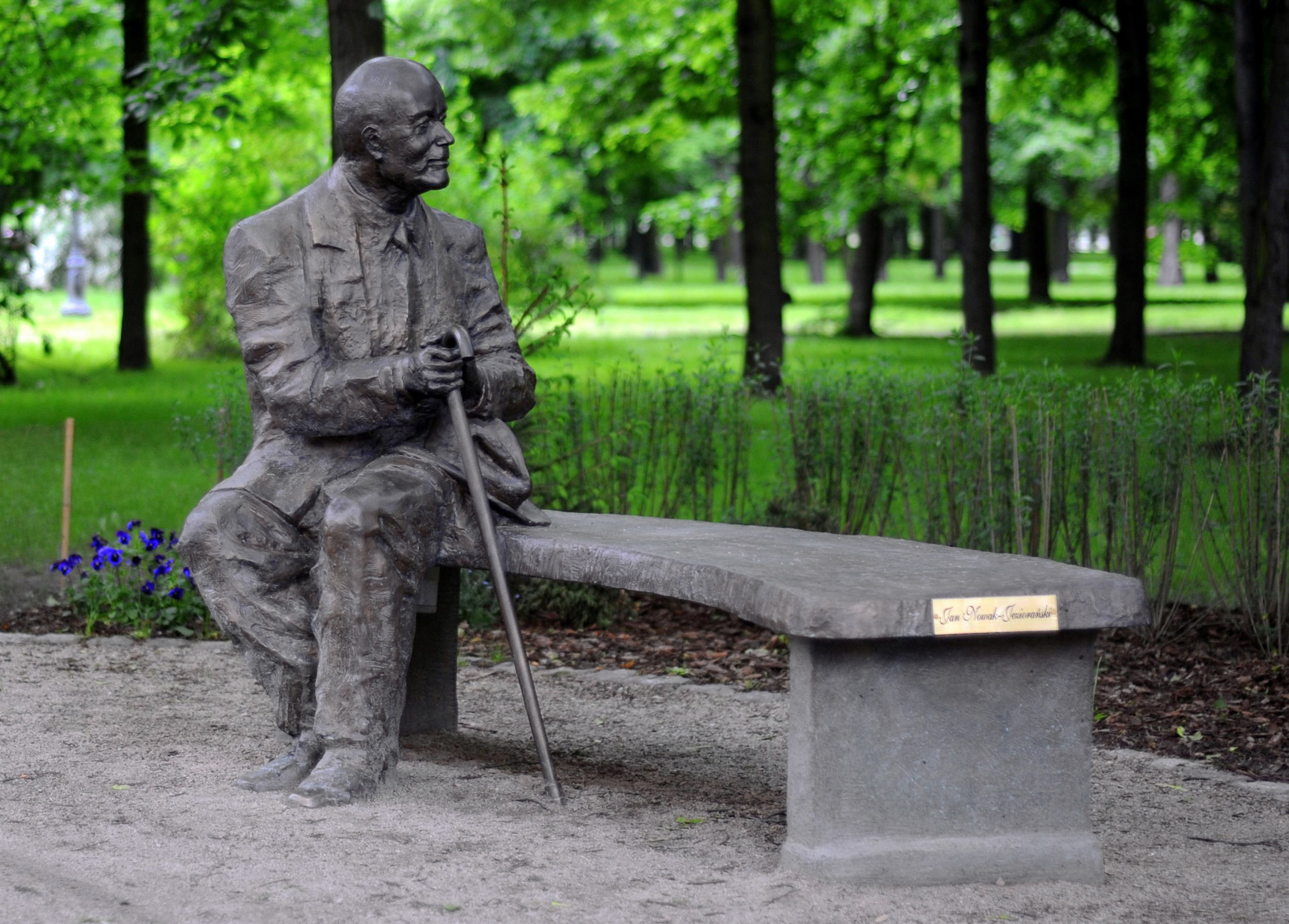
- The monument in 2008.
- Interactive map of Jan Nowak-Jeziorański Bench
- Location: Marshal Edward Rydz-Śmigły Park, Downtown, Warsaw, Poland
- Coordinates: 52°13′38.78″N 21°02′23.26″E
- Designer: Wojciech Gryniewicz
- Type: Statue, bench monument
- Material: Bronze
- Opening date: 19 October 2006
- Dedicated to: Jan Nowak-Jeziorański

The Jan Nowak-Jeziorański Bench (Polish pronunciation: [ˈjan ˈnɔ.vak jɛ.ʑɔˈraɲ.ski]; Polish: Ławeczka Jana Nowaka-Jeziorańskiego) is a bronze statue in Warsaw, Poland, placed in the Marshal Edward Rydz-Śmigły Park in font of a tenement house at 178A Czerniakowska Street. The monument was dedicated to Jan Nowak-Jeziorański (1914–2005), a 20th-century journalist, writer, politician, political scientist, social activist, and soldier, who, during the Second World War, served in the Polish resistance, most notably as remembered for his work as an emissary shuttling between the commanders of the Home Army and the Polish government-in-exile in London and other Allied governments which gained him the nickname, and for his participation in the Warsaw Uprising, and as the head of the Polish section of Radio Free Europe after the war. It was designed by Wojciech Gryniewicz, and unveiled on 19 October 2006.

== History ==
The monument was dedicated to Jan Nowak-Jeziorański (1914–2005), a 20th-century journalist, writer, politician, political scientist, social activist, and soldier, who, during the Second World War, served in the Polish resistance, most notably as remembered for his work as an emissary shuttling between the commanders of the Home Army and the Polish government-in-exile in London and other Allied governments which gained him the nickname, and for his participation in the Warsaw Uprising, and as the head of the Polish section of Radio Free Europe after the war. The sculpture was proposed by actor Jacek Fedorowicz, together with his wife Hanna, and was financed by the city of Warsaw. It was designed by Wojciech Gryniewicz, and unveiled on 19 October 2006, in the Marshal Edward Rydz-Śmigły Park, in font of a tenement house at 178A Czerniakowska Street. Nowak-Jeziorański spent last years living in said building, after moving to Warsaw in 2002. On the day of the unveiling, there was opened the Jan Nowak-Jeziorański Information Fentre, which operates as a library, and a local educational and cultural centre.

== Design ==
The bronze statue depicts elderly Jan Nowak-Jeziorański in a suit, siting on a bench, holding a cane in his both arms, and looking behind him. It is placed in the Marshal Edward Rydz-Śmigły Park, in font of a tenement house at 178A Czerniakowska Street. Nowak-Jeziorański spent last years living in said building, after moving to Warsaw in 2002. On the day of the unveiling, there was opened the Jan Nowak-Jeziorański Information Fentre, which operates as a library, and a local educational and cultural centre.
