= Julian Tuwim =

Polish poet (1894–1953)

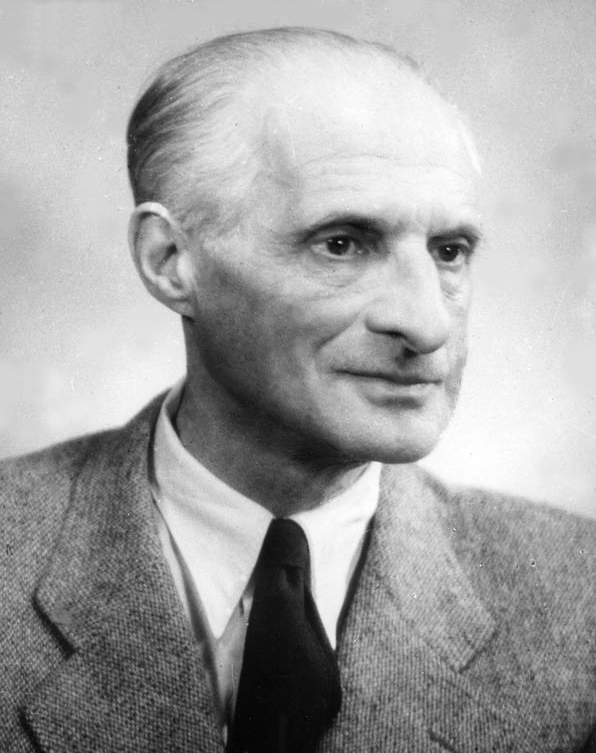
- Julian Tuwim
- Born: September 13, 1894; Łódź, Kalisz Governorate, Congress Poland
- Died: December 27, 1953 (aged 59); Zakopane, Kraków Voivodeship, Poland
- Occupations: Poet, writer, translator
- Spouse: Stefania Tuwimowa (since 1919)
- Children: Ewa Tuwim-Woźniak (adopted)
- Relatives: Irena Tuwim (sister, a poet herself); Kazimierz Krukowski (cousin)
- Writing career
- Notable awards: Golden Laurel of the Polish Academy of Literature
- Movement: Skamander

Julian Tuwim (13 September 1894 – 27 December 1953), known also under the pseudonym Oldlen as a lyricist, was a Polish poet, born in Łódź, then part of the Russian Partition. He was educated in Łódź and in Warsaw where he studied law and philosophy at Warsaw University. After Poland's return to independence in 1918, Tuwim co-founded the Skamander group of experimental poets with Antoni Słonimski and Jarosław Iwaszkiewicz. He was a major figure in Polish literature, admired also for his contribution to children's literature. He was a recipient of the prestigious Golden Laurel of the Polish Academy of Literature in 1935.

== Life and work ==
Tuwim was born into a family of assimilated Jews. The surname comes from the Hebrew tovim (טובים) meaning "good ones". His parents, Izydor and Adela, provided Julian with a comfortable middle-class upbringing. He was not a particularly diligent student and had to repeat the sixth grade. In 1905 the family had to flee from Łódź to Wrocław (Breslau) in order to escape possible repercussions following Izydor's involvement in the Revolution of 1905.

Initially, Tuwim's poetry, even more than that of the other Skamandrites, represented a decisive break with turn-of-the-20th-century mannerism. It was characterized by an expression of vitality, optimism, in praise of urban life. His poems celebrated everyday life in the city, with its triviality and vulgarity. Tuwim often used vernacular language in his work, along with slang as well as poetic dialogue.

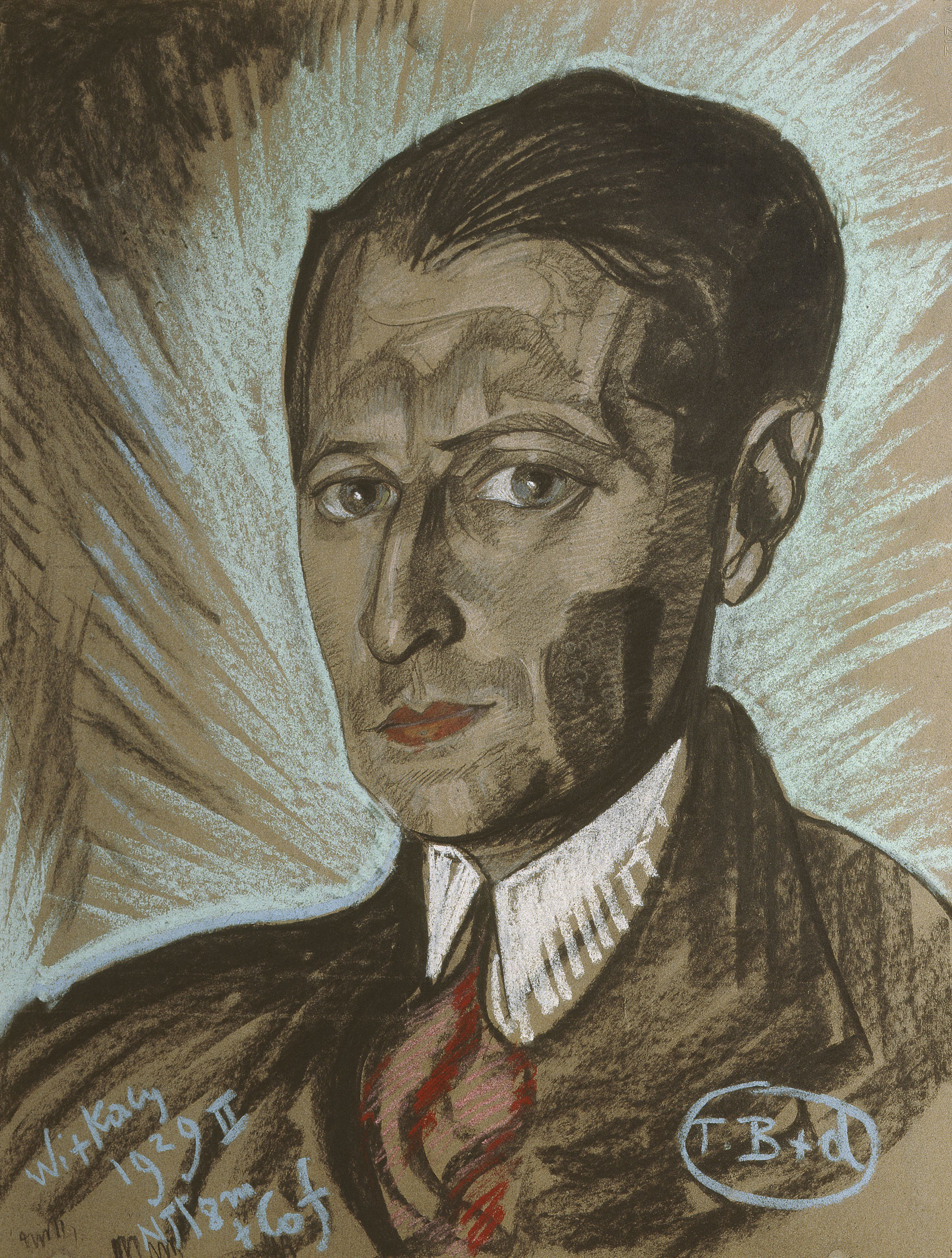
Portrait of Tuwim by Witkacy.

His collections Czyhanie na Boga ("In Lurking for God"; 1918), Sokrates tańczący ("Dancing Socrates"; 1920), Siódma jesień ("Seventh Autumn"; 1922), and Wierszy tom czwarty ("Poems, Volume Four"; 1923) are typical of his early work. In his later collections – Słowa we krwi ("Words in the Blood"; 1926), Rzecz Czarnoleska ("The Czarnolas Matter"; 1929), Biblia cygańska ("The Gypsy Bible"; 1933) and Treść gorejąca ("A Burning Matter"; 1933) – Tuwim became restless and bitter, and wrote with fervour and vehemence about the emptiness of urban existence. He also drew more heavily from the romantic and classicist traditions, while perfecting his form and style, and becoming a virtuoso wordsmith.

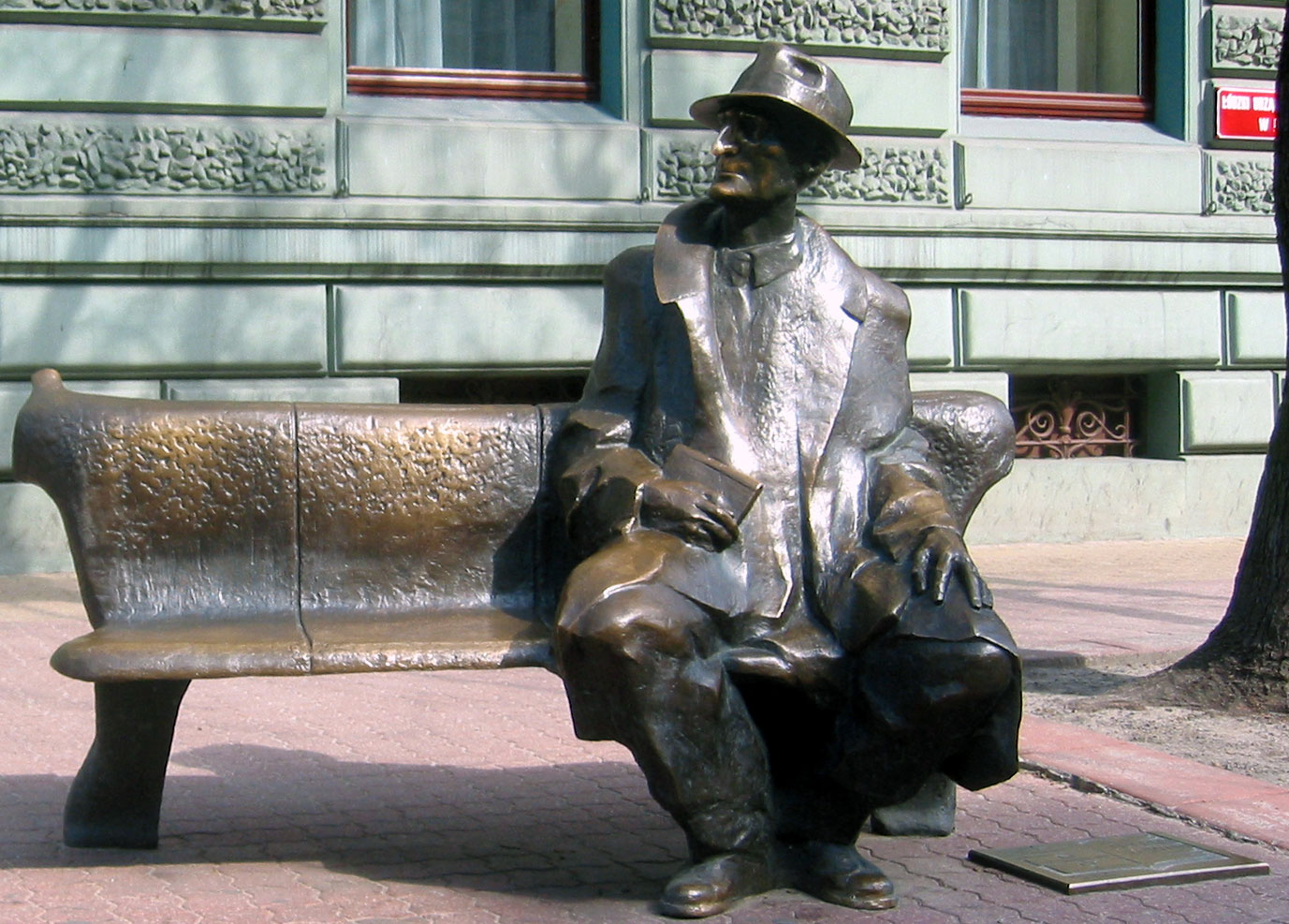
Julian Tuwim Monument by sculptor Wojciech Gryniewicz

From the very beginning and throughout his artistic career, Tuwim was satirically inclined. He supplied sketches and monologues to numerous cabarets. In his poetry and articles, he derided obscurantism and bureaucracy as well as militaristic and nationalistic trends in politics. His burlesque Bal w Operze ("The Ball at the Opera"; 1936) is regarded as his best satirical poem.

In 1918, Tuwim co-founded the cabaret (comedy troupe) named Picador and worked as a writer or artistic director with many other comedy troupes, such as Czarny Kot (1917–1919), Quid pro Quo (1919–1932), Banda, Stara Banda (1932–1935), and finally Cyrulik Warszawski (1935–1939). Since 1924, Tuwim was a staff writer at Wiadomości Literackie where he wrote a weekly column titled Camera Obscura. He also wrote for the satirical magazine Szpilki.

Tuwim displayed his caustic sense of humour and unyielding individuality in works such as "Poem in which the author politely but firmly implores the vast hosts of his brethren to kiss his arse." Here, Tuwim systematically enumerates and caricatures various personalities of the European social scene of the mid-1930s -- 'perfumed café intellectuals', 'drab socialists', 'fascist jocks', 'Zionist doctors', 'repressed Catholics' and so on, and ends every stanza by asking each to perform the action indicated in the title. The poem ends with a note to the would-be censor who would surely be tempted to expunge all mention of this piece for its breach of 'public standards.'

His poem Do prostego człowieka (To the Common Man), first published on 7 October 1929 in Robotnik, provoked a storm of attacks on Tuwim both from left-wing circles, which criticized the poem's "bourgeois expression of pacifist sentiment", and from right-wing groups which accused Tuwim of calling for the disarmament of the young state.

Julian's aunt was married to Adam Czerniaków, and his uncle from his mother's side was Arthur Rubinstein.

== World War II and after ==
In 1939, at the beginning of World War II and the German occupation of Poland, Tuwim emigrated through Romania to France, where in August 1940 he received a visa to Portugal from the Portuguese consul general in Bordeaux, Aristides de Sousa Mendes. In 1942 he travelled to Brazil, by way of Portugal, and finally to the US, where he settled until the end of the war. In 1939–1941, he collaborated with the émigré weekly "Wiadomości Polskie", but broke off the collaboration due to differences in views on the attitude towards the Soviet Union. In 1942–1946, he worked with the monthly "Nowa Polska" published in London, and with leftist Polish-American newspapers. He was affiliated with the Polish section of the International Workers Organization from 1942. He was also a member of the Association of Writers From Poland (a member of the board in 1943).

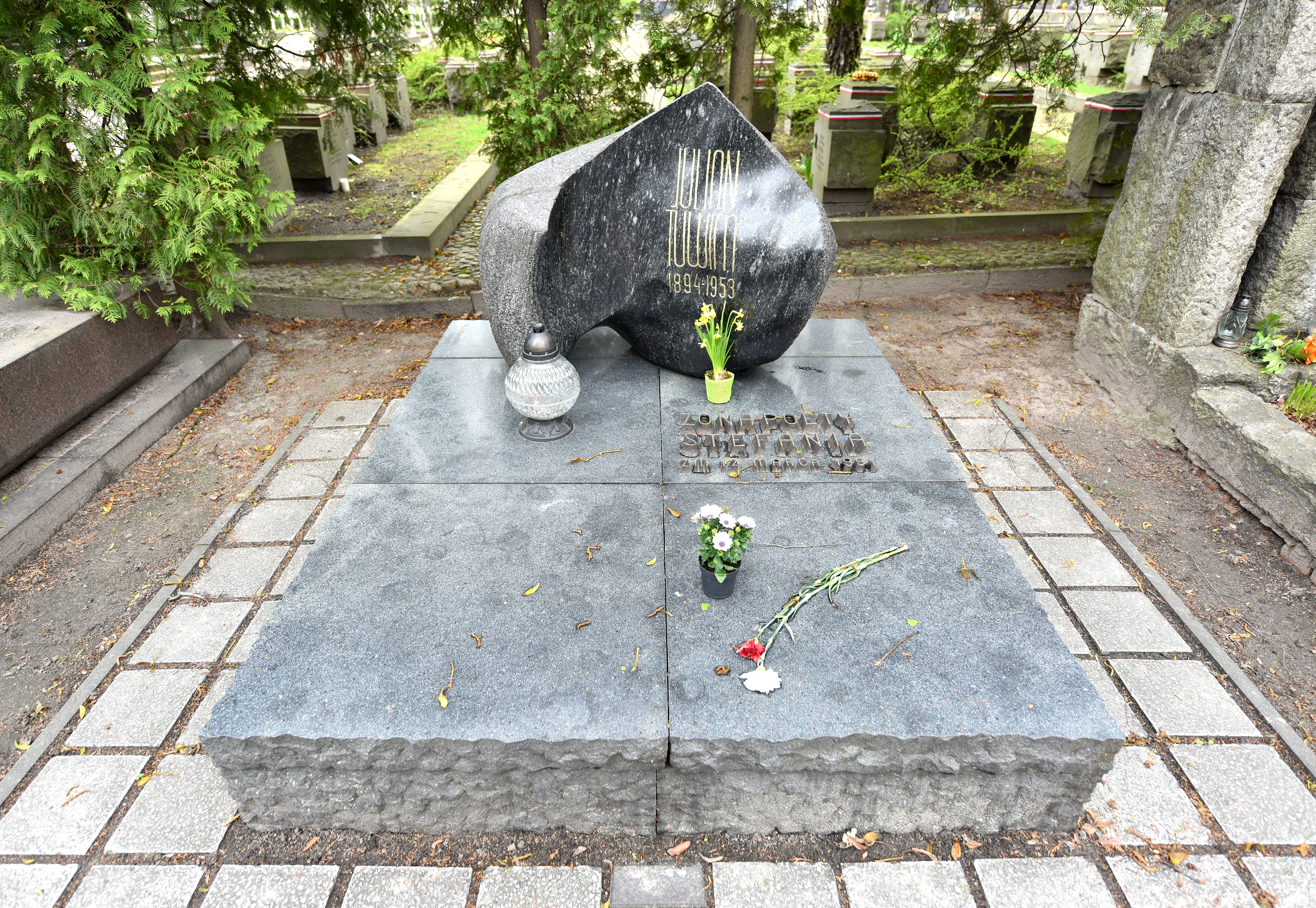
Tuwim's grave in Warsaw's Powązki Cemetery.

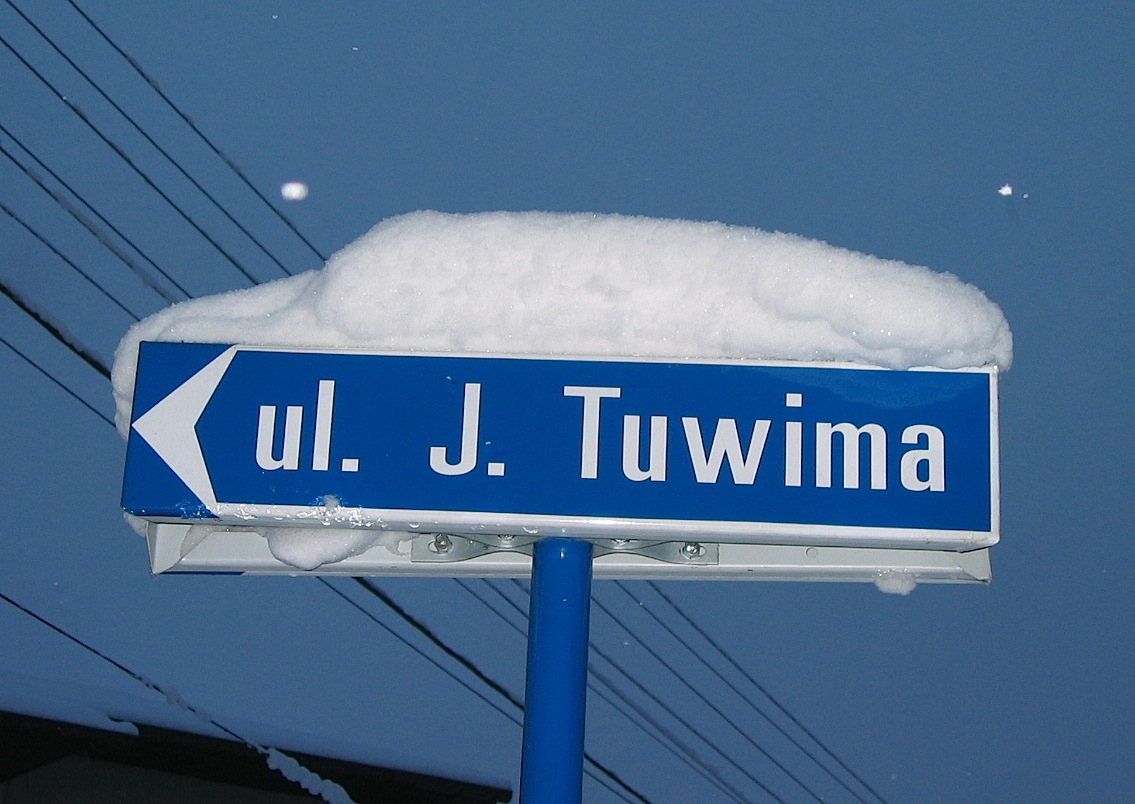
Tuwim St. in Chrzanów

During this time he wrote "Kwiaty Polskie" (Polish Flowers), an epic poem in which he remembers with nostalgia his early childhood in Łódź. In April 1944 he published a manifesto, entitled "My, Żydzi Polscy" (We, Polish Jews).

Tuwim returned to Poland after the war in 1946 but did not produce much in Stalinist Poland. He died in 1953 at the age of 59 in Zakopane. Although Tuwim was well known for serious poetry, he also wrote satirical works and children's poems, for example Lokomotywa (The Locomotive; 1938, tr. 1940), translated into many languages. He also wrote well-regarded translations of Pushkin and other Russian poets.

Russian Soviet poet Yelizaveta Tarakhovskaya translated most of Tuwim's children's poetry into Russian.

== Notable poems ==
- Czyhanie na Boga (Lurking for God, 1918)
- Sokrates tańczący (Dancing Socrates, 1920)
- Siódma jesień (The Seventh Autumn, 1921)
- Wierszy tom czwarty (Poems, volume four, 1923)
- Murzynek Bambo (The little black boy, Bambo, 1923 or 1924, published 1935)
- Czary i czarty polskie (Sorcery and Deuces of Poland, 1924)
- Wypisy czarnoksięskie (The Sorcery Reader, 1924)
- A to pan zna? (And do you know this, sir?, 1925)
- Czarna msza (Black Mass, 1925)
- Tysiąc dziwów prawdziwych (A thousand true wonders, 1925)
- Słowa we krwi (Words in the blood, 1926)
- Tajemnice amuletów i talizmanów (Secrets of amulets and talismans, 1926)
- Strofy o późnym lecie (stanzas on a late summer)
- Rzecz czarnoleska (The Czarnolas affair, 1929)
- Jeździec miedziany (The brazen rider, 1932)
- Biblia cygańska i inne wiersze (The Gypsy Bible and other poems, 1932)
- Jarmark rymów (The rhyme market, 1934)
- Polski słownik pijacki i antologia bachiczna (The Polish drunk's lexicon and anthology of Bacchus, 1935)
- Treść gorejąca (A Burning Matter, 1936)
- Lokomotywa (The Locomotive, 1938)
- Rzepka (The Turnip, 1938)
- Bal w Operze (A ball at the opera, 1936, published 1946)
- Kwiaty polskie (Flowers from Poland, 1940–1946, published 1949)
- Pegaz dęba, czyli panoptikum poetyckie (Prancing Pegasus, or the poetical panoply, 1950)
- Piórem i piórkiem (With pen and quill, 1951)

== Tuwim's poems set to music ==
- Karol Szymanowski - Słopiewnie for voice and piano, op. 46bis (1921)
- Witold Lutosławski - Piosenki dziecinne (Children's Songs) (1952); Spóźniony słowik (The overdue nightingale, 1947), O Panu Tralalińskim (About Mr. Tralalinski, 1947), for voice and piano (also arr. for orchestra)
- Several of his poems were set to music by Zygmunt Konieczny and sung by Ewa Demarczyk, including "Tomaszów" and "Grande Valse Brillante" (this text is part of the Kwiaty Polskie poem, which references the Chopin composition several times)
- Mieczysław Weinberg - Symphony No. 8 Polish Flowers, Op. 83 (1964)
- Krzysztof Meyer - Quartettino for voice, flute, cello and piano (1966); Symphony No. 2 (1967); Spiewy polskie (Polish Songs) for voice and orchestra (1974)
- David Bruce - Piosenki for soprano, baritone and ensemble (2006) - setting of 11 songs. Piosenki at David Bruce's website
- Akurat - Do Prostego Człowieka
- Czesław Niemen - Wspomnienie
- Marek Grechuta - Mandarynki i pomarańcze
- Hańba! - Hoży i świeży
- Sanah - "Warszawa"
