= Statue of father Jan Twardowski =

Monument in Warsaw, Poland

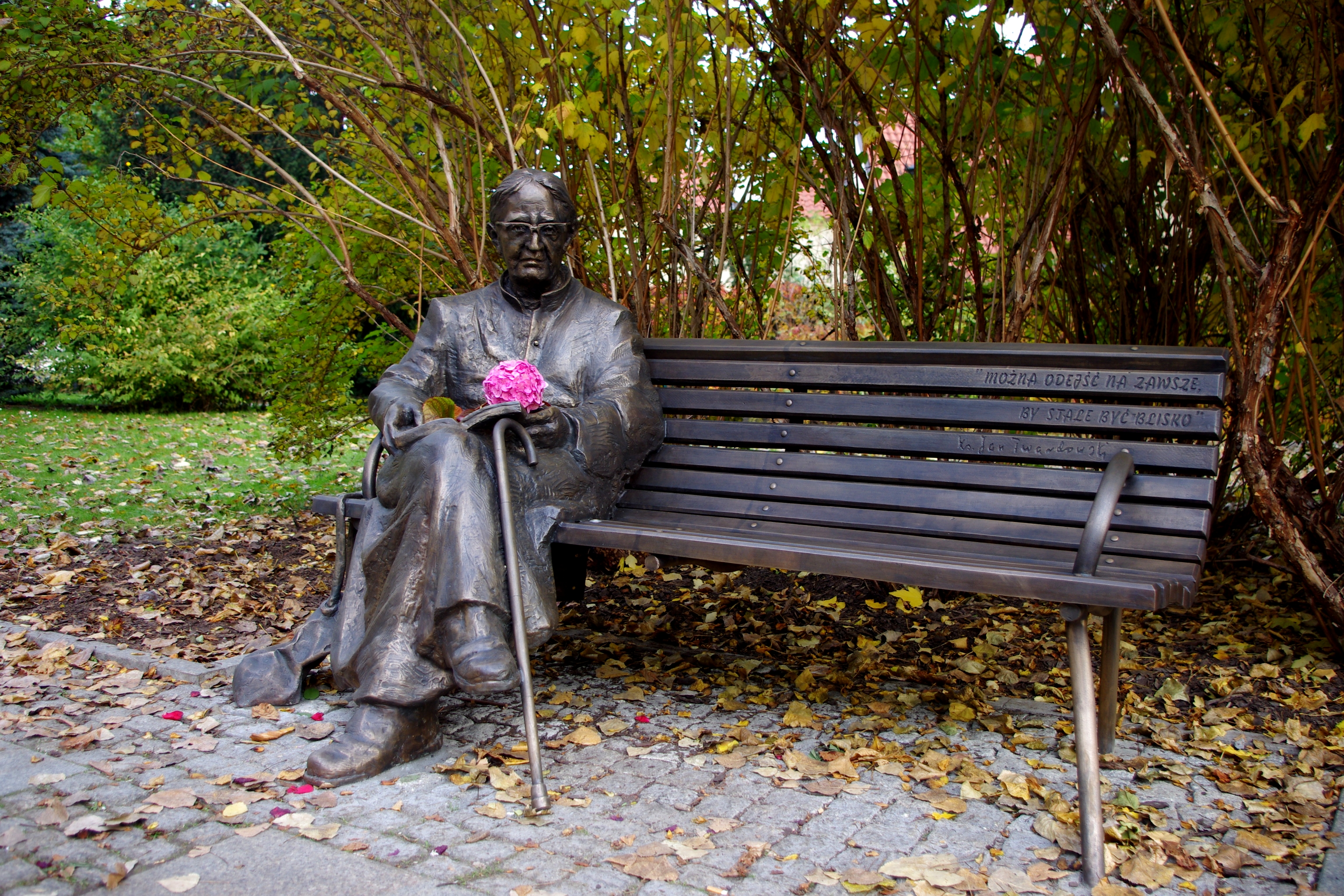
- The monument in 2013.
- Interactive map of Statue of father Jan Twardowski
- Location: Twardowski Square, Downtown, Warsaw, Poland
- Coordinates: 52.241590°N 21.016872°E
- Designer: Wojciech Gryniewicz
- Type: Statue
- Material: Bronze
- Opening date: 10 October 2013
- Dedicated to: Jan Twardowski

The statue of father Jan Twardowski (Polish: Pomnik ks. Jana Twardowskiego) is a bronze statue in Warsaw, Poland, within the Downtown district, placed at the Twardowski Square, near to the Visitationist Church at 34 Kraków Suburb Street. The monument is dedicated to Jan Twardowski, a 20th-century Catholic prist and poet. It was designed by Wojciech Gryniewicz, and unveiled on 10 October 2013.

== History ==
The monument was designed by Wojciech Gryniewicz, and dedicated to Jan Twardowski, a 20th-century Catholic prist and poet. Its construction was financed by the Pope John Paul II Institute and the Warsaw Insurgents Association, and it cost 100,000 Polish złoties. The sculpture was unveiled on 10 October 2013, at the Twardowski Square, by Jacek Michałowski, the chief of the Chancellery of the President, and Jacek Wojciechowicz, the deputy mayor of Warsaw. The ceremony was attended by, among others, Kazimierz Nycz, the Archbishop of Warsaw, Jacek Kozłowski, the voivode of the Masovian Voivodeship, Jan Stanisław Ciechanowski, the chief of the Office for War Veterans and Victims of Oppression, and actors Maja Komorowska and Anna Nehrebecka. During the ceremony, actors Anna Seniuk, Agnieszka Grochowska, and Cezary Żak have read Twarodwski's poems.

== Characteristics ==
The monument is placed at the Twardowski Square, near the Visitationist Church at 34 Kraków Suburb Street. It includes a bronze life-sized statue of Jan Twardowski, sitting in the left corner of a bench. He is depicted in an old age, wearing Catholic priest cassock and glasses, while reading a book, with his legs crossed, and a walking stick resting on them. The bench contains audio player, which when activated via pushing a button, plays recording of Twardowski reading some of his poems. It also features an inspiration, being quote from his poem titled Nie przyszedłem Pana nawracać. It reads "Można odejść na zawsze, by stale być blisko", and translates to "One can leave forever, to always stay close".
