= Julian Tuwim Monument, Łódź =

Coordinates: 51°45′52″N 19°27′26″E

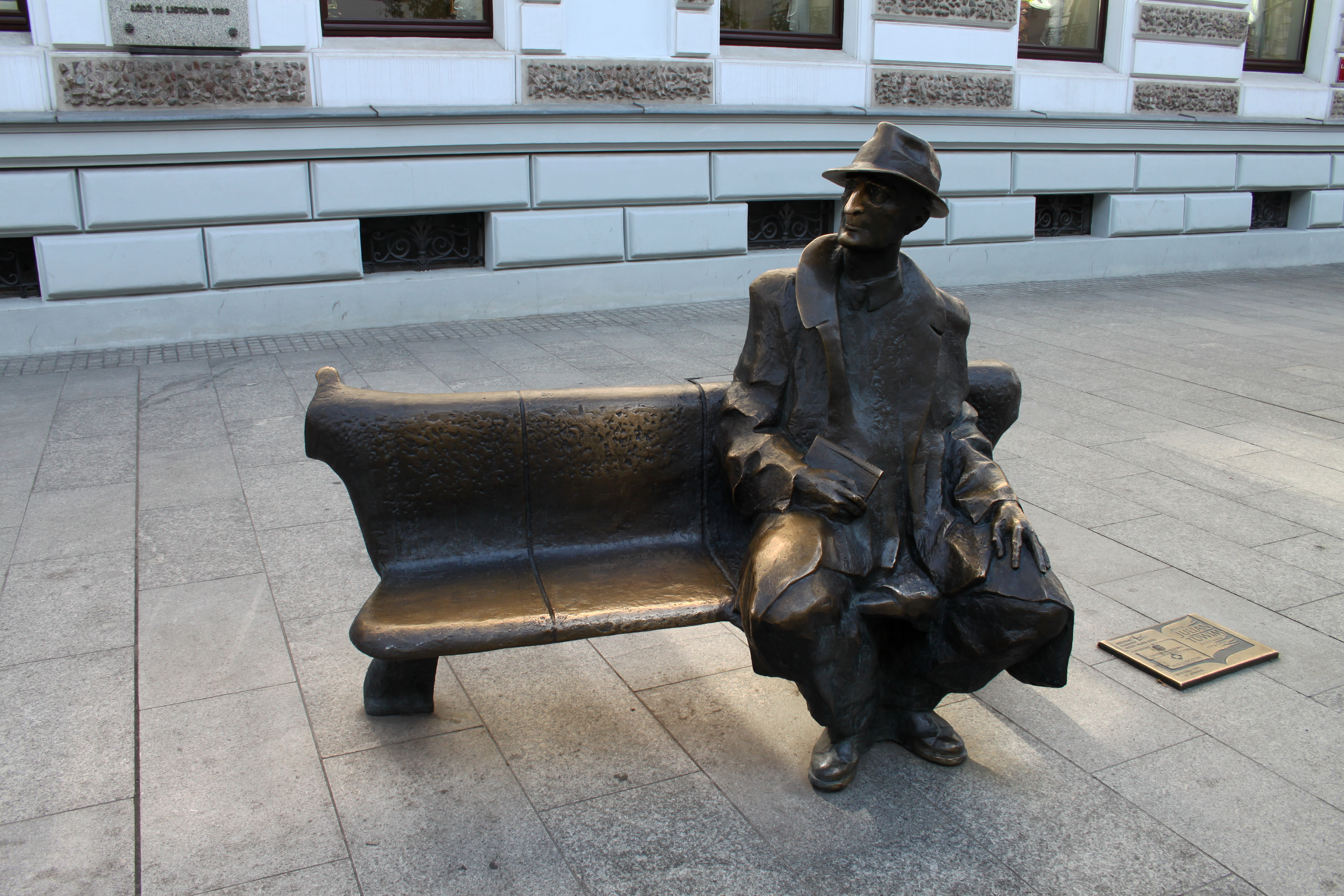
Julian Tuwim Monument in 2018

Julian Tuwim Monument or the Tuwim's Bench (Polish: Ławeczka Tuwima) is a monument dedicated to Julian Tuwim at the Piotrkowska Street district of Łódź, Poland. The monument was constructed in 1998-1999 by sculptor Wojciech Gryniewicz.

== Television ==
- 2012: TVP- "Łódź kreatywna - WOJCIECH GRYNIEWICZ"

== Prizes for Wojciech Gryniewicz ==
- 2003: Julian Tuwim Monument ("Ławeczka Tuwima")- The Best Art Sculptures 2003 – I Prize
- 2005: Julian Tuwim Monument ("Ławeczka Tuwima")- Prize Poland's Travel, Ministry of Culture and National Heritage (Poland)
