= Helenów Park in Łódź =

Park in Łódź

Helenów Park
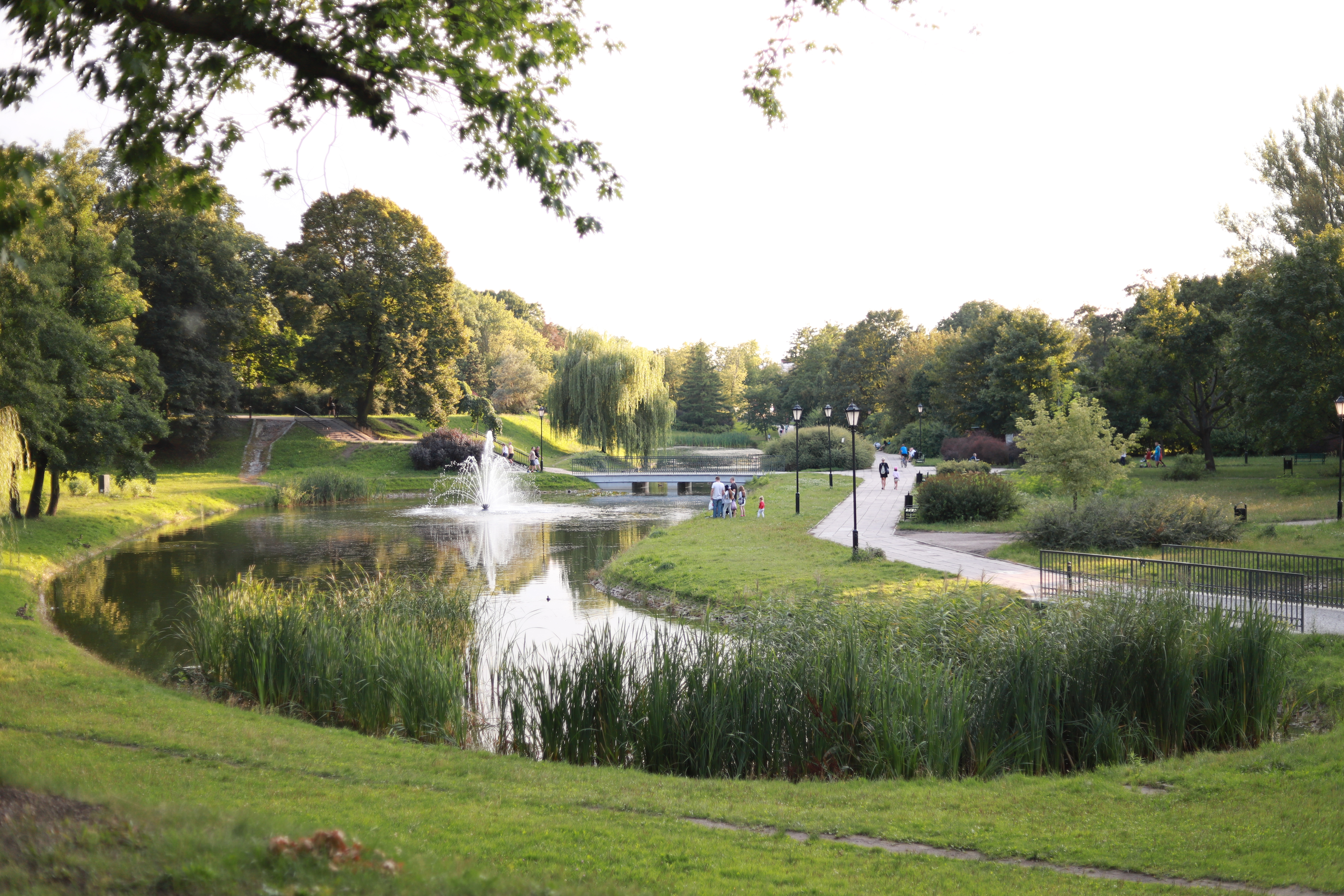
- Overview of the park
- Interactive map of Helenów Park
- Type: Municipal
- Location: Łódź
- Coordinates: 51°46′54″N 19°28′08″E
- Area: 12 ha
- Created: 1881
- Status: Open all year

Helenów Park in Łódź, Poland is a park located between Północna, Źródłowa and Smugowa streets and covers an area of 12 hectare. Of all park trees, five are natural monuments: two pedunculate oaks with a circumference of 320 and 340 cm, common beech with a circumference of 245 cm, red oak with a circumference of 350 cm and ash tree with a circumference of 385 cm. The park is entered in the Registry of Objects of Cultural Heritage.

== History ==
In 1867, a brewery founded on the Łódka River by Karol Anstadt started operations. Next to the brewery buildings, a house inhabited by the Anstadt family and a house for workers was built. Over time, the family began to buy areas around the brewery, including grounds in the Łódka valley. Within 20 years of the brewery's establishment, the factory grounds increased five times. The three brothers Ludwik, Zenon and Fryderyk, who after the death of their father - Karol Anstadt in 1874 took over the management of the company, decided to establish a park. Later Karol Anstadt junior joined the originators. In 1881, they obtained permission from the authorities to build a park, which was named after Helenow (Helena née Nestler) and Zenon (Helena né Lemmów). Work began on a 12-hectare site, the Łódka riverbed was adjusted and two ponds were built on the river.

The park was developed by the Berlin gardening company L. Späth, like a few other Łódź parks (Źródliska II, Julianowski). The swampy area quickly changed into an impressive, lavish garden. Among the attractions there were ponds with a marina for boats, fountains and a stone cascade on the embankment, rose avenues, wildlife park (arranged in March 1890, where one could see a couple of bears, a trained chimpanzee, deer, fallow deer, roe deer, wild boars and hares), a volcanic lava cave, terraces, rich flowerbeds, concert bowl, cycling track, tennis courts and a sports field. An alley lined with pears led from the entrance to the park, later turned into red oaks and maples. The entrance to the fenced park was (up to this day) from Polnocna street.The park was also an early venue for cinema in Łódź; the city's first film screening took place there on 1 August 1896.

=== Gradual fall (1914–1989) ===
The time of Helenów Park glory did not last long. The first crisis came with the outbreak of World War I, when the park was largely devastated. Although in the interwar period, attempts were made to restore its splendor (Helenów's attractions were still available for a fee), it never succeeded. The cycling track ended several times (in 1929, 1937, 1947–49 and 1961) in the Łódź stages of the Tour de Pologne. After World War II, after one year of use by the army, the park became the property of the city. Then it was given the name 19 January Park, commemorating the date of the entry of the Red Army into Lodz and the end of German occupation of the city. The park was cleaned, open to all residents of Łódź, the eastern part was handed over to the sports club. The zoo, concert shell, marina and fence were demolished, which changed its function - it became a link between Północna and Sporna street. The greenery has also been largely depleted. Initially, various types of events, concerts and games were organized in the park, but with time such activities were abandoned. On 8 May 1949 the finish line of the 7th stage of the 2nd Peace Race was placed on the park pitch.

=== Modernization ===
For many years, the park (and especially the ponds) was neglected, it was only in the 1990s that comprehensive modernization was carried out: ponds and alleys were restored, a large playground was built and the main avenues were illuminated. The entrance gate along with a fragment of the fence was restored, and in the place of the ruined fountain with the figure of a girl sitting surrounded by four swans rising to flight, a flower bed was created. On 27 May 1994 the City Council in Łódź restored the original name of Helenowski Park.

In 2000, a small area was attached to the park from Smugowa street. It has sport functions: A playground, tennis tables and chess tables were created there. On 10 November 2003, on the southern edge of the park, next to the intersection of Polnocna and Sterlinga streets, a monument to the Glory of the Soldiers of the "Łódź Army" was unveiled.

== See also ==
- Karol Anstadt Avenue, Łódź
