= Jan Twardowski =

Polish poet and Catholic priest

Jan Jakub Twardowski
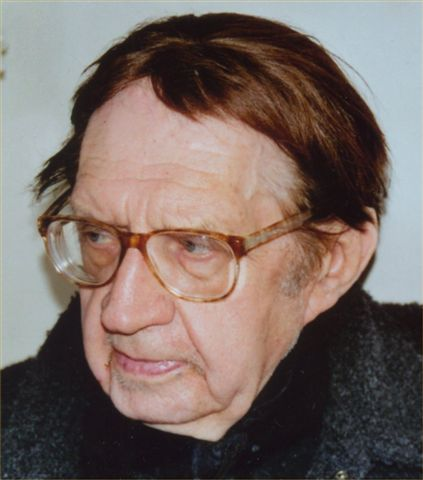
- Jan Twardowski in Warsaw, March 2000
- Born: 1 June 1915; Warsaw, Poland
- Died: 18 January 2006 (aged 90); Warsaw, Poland
- Occupations: Poet, Catholic priest

Jan Jakub Twardowski (1 June 1915 – 18 January 2006) was a Polish poet and Catholic priest. He was a chief Polish representative of contemporary religious lyrics. He wrote short, simple, often humorous poems that frequently included colloquialisms. His poetry joined observations of nature with philosophical reflection.

== Biography ==
Jan Twardowski was born on 1 June 1915 in Warsaw, Congress Poland. His parents were Jan Twardowski and Aniela Maria Konderska. Several weeks after his birth, due to the events of World War I, his family moved to Russia. After 3 years, they returned to Warsaw. He finished middle school in 1935. In 1932, he began working with the youth newspaper "Kuźnia Młodych" ("Forge of the Young"). He had his own column there, for which he wrote poems, short stories, and interviewed various writers.

After middle school, he began studying literature at the Józef Piłsudski University (University of Warsaw). In 1937 he published his first book of poetry.

During World War II he took part in various operations organised by the Armia Krajowa and fought in the Warsaw Uprising.

After the war, he joined a seminary and began studying theology at the Warsaw University. He became a priest in 1948. In 1959 he became a provost of the Visitationist Church. His writings were published in a popular Polish Catholic magazine, Tygodnik Powszechny. He gained fame in 1960 after publishing his first poetry book, "Znak Ufności" ("The Sign of Trust"). In 1980 he received the PEN Club and Robert Graves lifetime achievement awards, and, in 1996, the Order Uśmiechu (The Order of the Smile). In 2000, Twardowski won the IKAR prize, and was rewarded with the TOTUS prize a year later.

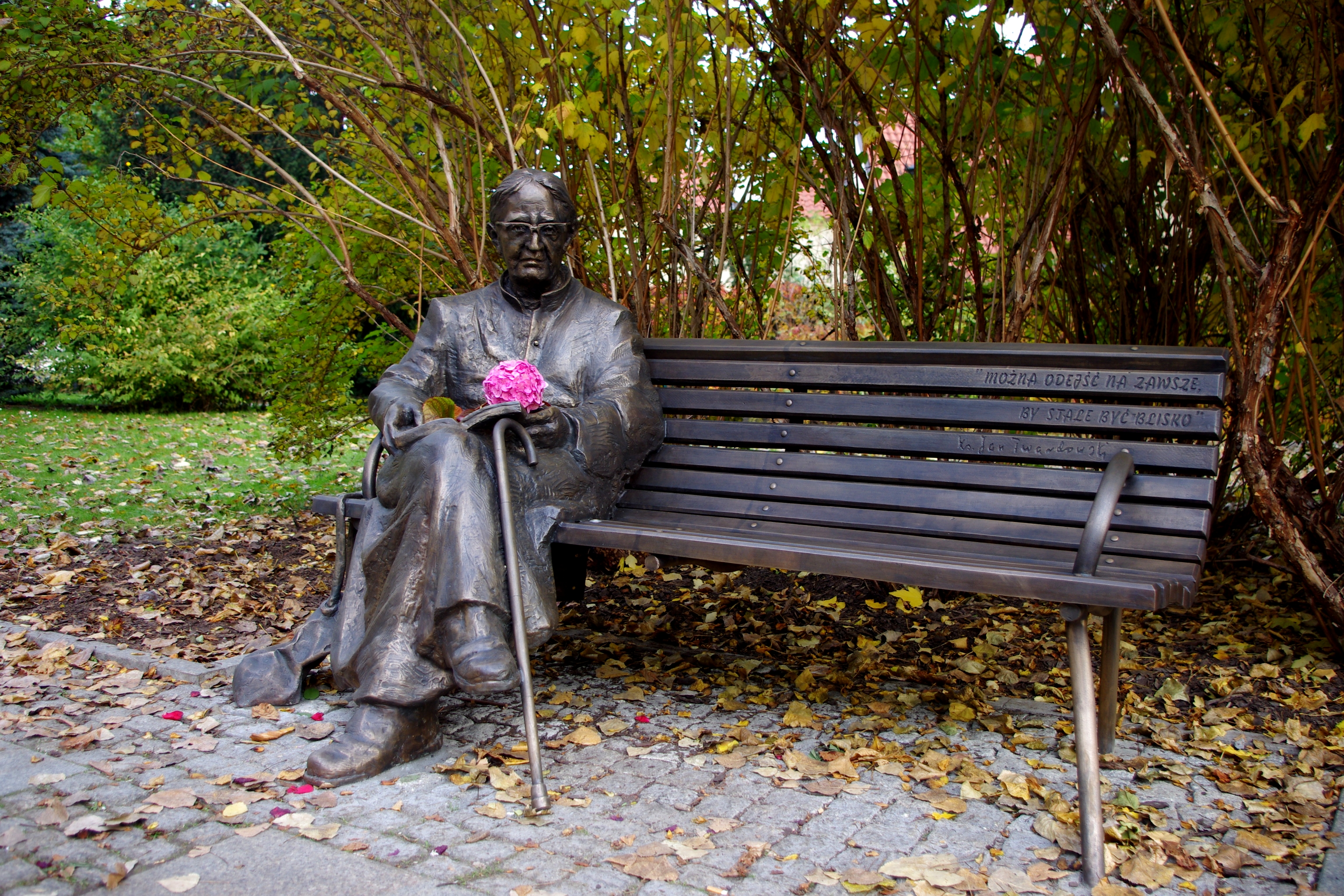
The Father Jan Twardowski Monument in Warsaw, Poland.

Jan Twardowski died on 18 January 2006 in Warsaw at the age of 90. He was buried within the crypts of the Temple of Divine Providence on the outskirts of the Polish capital, despite the fact that he wanted to be buried at the Powązki cemetery in Warsaw.

== Works ==
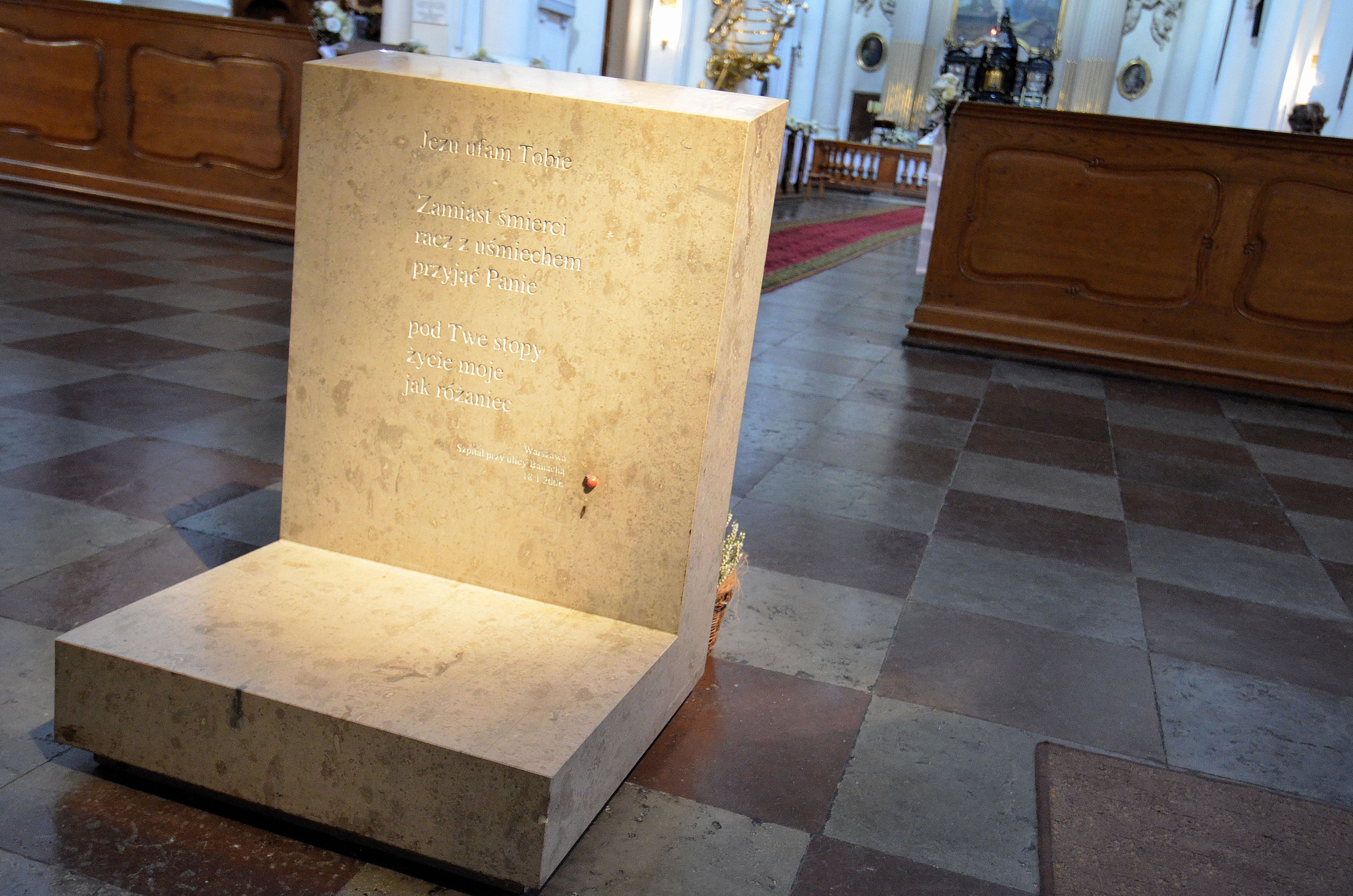
A kneeler erected in the memory of Jan Twardowski, engraved with his last poem - Visitationist Church, Warsaw

Poetry:

- 1959: Wiersze, ("Verses"); Warsaw
- 1970: Znaki ufności, ("Signs of Trust"), Kraków: Znak
- 1980: Niebieskie okulary, ("Blue Sunglasses"), Kraków: Znak
- 1983: Który stwarzasz jagody ("Who Made the Blueberry"), Kraków: Wydawnictwo literackie
- 1986: Nie przyszedłem pana nawracać. Wiersze z lat 1937-1985 "I Have Not Come to Convert You: Poems From the Years 1937-1985"), Warsaw: Wydawnictwo Archidiecezji Warszawskiej ("Warsaw Archdiocese Publisher")
- 1990: Tak ludzka ("So Human"), Poznań: Księgarnia św. Wojciech
- 1991: Uśmiech Pana Boga. Wiersze dla dzieci ("The Smile of God. Poems for children"), Warsaw: Nasza Księgarnia
- 1993: Kasztan dla milionera. Wiersze dla dzieci ("A Chestnut For a Millionaire. Poems for Children"), Warsaw: Nasza Księgarnia
- 1993: Krzyżyk na drogę ("A cross for the road"), Kraków: Znak
- 1996: Rwane prosto z krzaka ("Torn Right Off the Bush"), Warsaw: PIW
- 1998: Bóg prosi o miłość - Gott fleht um Liebe ("God Asks for Love"), Kraków: Wydawnictwo Literary
- 1998: Niebo w dobrym humorze ("Heaven in Good Mood"), Warsaw: PIW
- 1999: Miłość miłości szuka, Volumes 1 and 2 ("Love Seeks Love"), Warsaw: PIW, Księgarnia i Drukarnia Świętego Wojciecha
- 2000: Elementarz księdza Twardowskiego dla najmłodszego, średniaka i starszego, Kraków: Wydawnictwo literackie
- 2001: Kiedy mówisz ("When You Say"), Kraków: Wydawnictwo literackie
- 2006: Kilka myśli o cierpieniu, przemijaniu i odejściu, Poznan: Księgarnia Św. Wojciecha ("A few thoughts about suffering, passing and leaving")

Prose:

- 1973: Zeszyt w kratkę ("The Graph-Paper Notebook"), Kraków: Znak
- 1986: Nowy zeszyt w kratkę ("The New Graph-Paper Notebook"), Poznan: Pallotinum
- 1987: Patyki i patyczki ("Sticks and Twigs"), Warsaw: Wydawnictwo Archidiecezji Warszawskiej "Publisher of the Archdiocese of Warsaw"
- 1991: Niecodziennik ("Not Quite a Diary"), Kraków: Maszachaba
