= Jan Nowak-Jeziorański =

Polish journalist and writer (1914–2005)

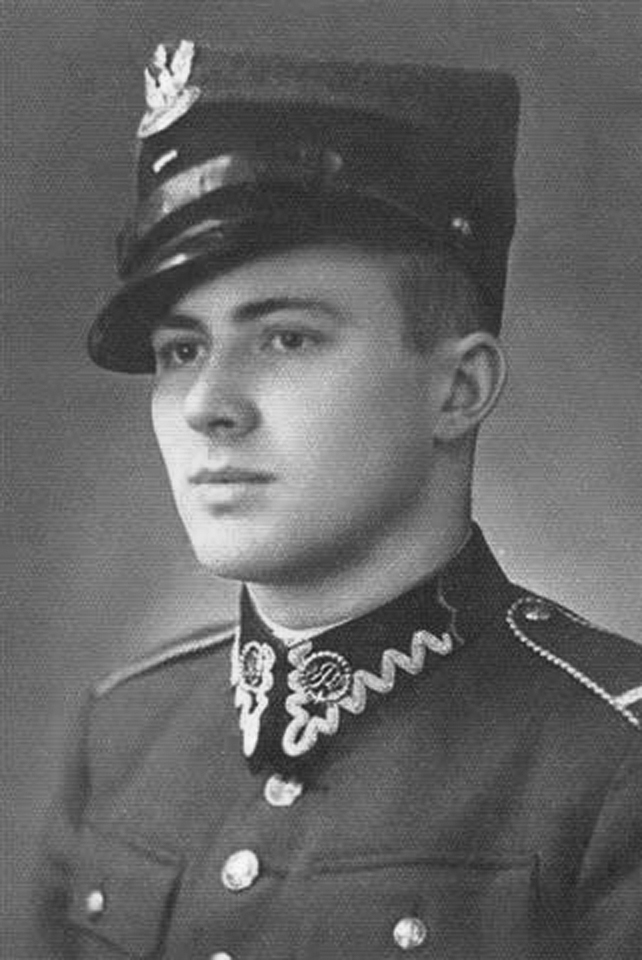
Zdzisław Jeziorański

Jan Nowak-Jeziorański (Polish: [ˈjan ˈnɔ.vak jɛ.ʑɔˈraɲ.ski]; 2 October 1914 – 20 January 2005) was a Polish journalist, writer, politician, social worker and patriot. He served during the Second World War as a resistance fighter of the Home Army. He is most well-known for his work as an emissary shuttling between the commanders of the Home Army and the Polish government-in-exile in London and other Allied governments which gained him the nickname "Courier from Warsaw", and for his participation in the Warsaw Uprising. Following the war he worked as the head of the Polish section of Radio Free Europe, and later as a security advisor to the US presidents Ronald Reagan and Jimmy Carter. In 1996, President Bill Clinton awarded him with America's highest civilian award the Presidential Medal of Freedom.

He was born Zdzisław Antoni Jeziorański, (Jeziora Coat of Arms) in Berlin, but used a number of noms de guerre during the war, most notably Jan Nowak, which he later added to his original surname.

== Biography ==
Zdzisław Jeziorański was born on 2 October 1914 in Berlin. He attended Gimnazjum i Liceum im. Stefana Batorego in Warsaw. After finishing his studies in economics in 1936, he worked as a teaching assistant at Poznań University. Mobilized in 1939, he fought in the Polish Army as an artillery non-commissioned officer. He was taken prisoner of war by the Germans in Volhynia, but managed to escape and returned to Warsaw. Most of his colleagues were taken prisoners of war by the Soviets and later killed in the Katyn massacre.

He quickly joined the Polish resistance. After 1940 he became the main organiser of the Akcja N, a secret organisation preparing German-language newspapers and other propaganda material pretending to be official German publications, to wage psychological warfare against German troops.

He also served as an envoy between the commanders of the Home Army and the Polish government-in-exile and other allied governments. During his first trips to Sweden and Great Britain he informed the Western governments of the fate of Poland under German and Soviet occupation. He was also the first to report the Warsaw Ghetto Uprising. During one of such missions, in July 1944, he returned to Warsaw only a few days before the Warsaw Uprising broke out.

During the Uprising Nowak-Jeziorański took an active part in the fight against the Germans and also organised the Polish radio that maintained contact with Allied countries through daily broadcasts in Polish and English. Shortly before the capitulation of the Polish capital, he was ordered by Home Army's commander-in-chief Tadeusz Bór-Komorowski to leave the city and find his way to London. He managed to evade being captured and reached Great Britain, bringing with him large quantities of documents and photos. For his bravery and his travels through the German-occupied Europe he was awarded with the Virtuti Militari, the highest Polish military medal.

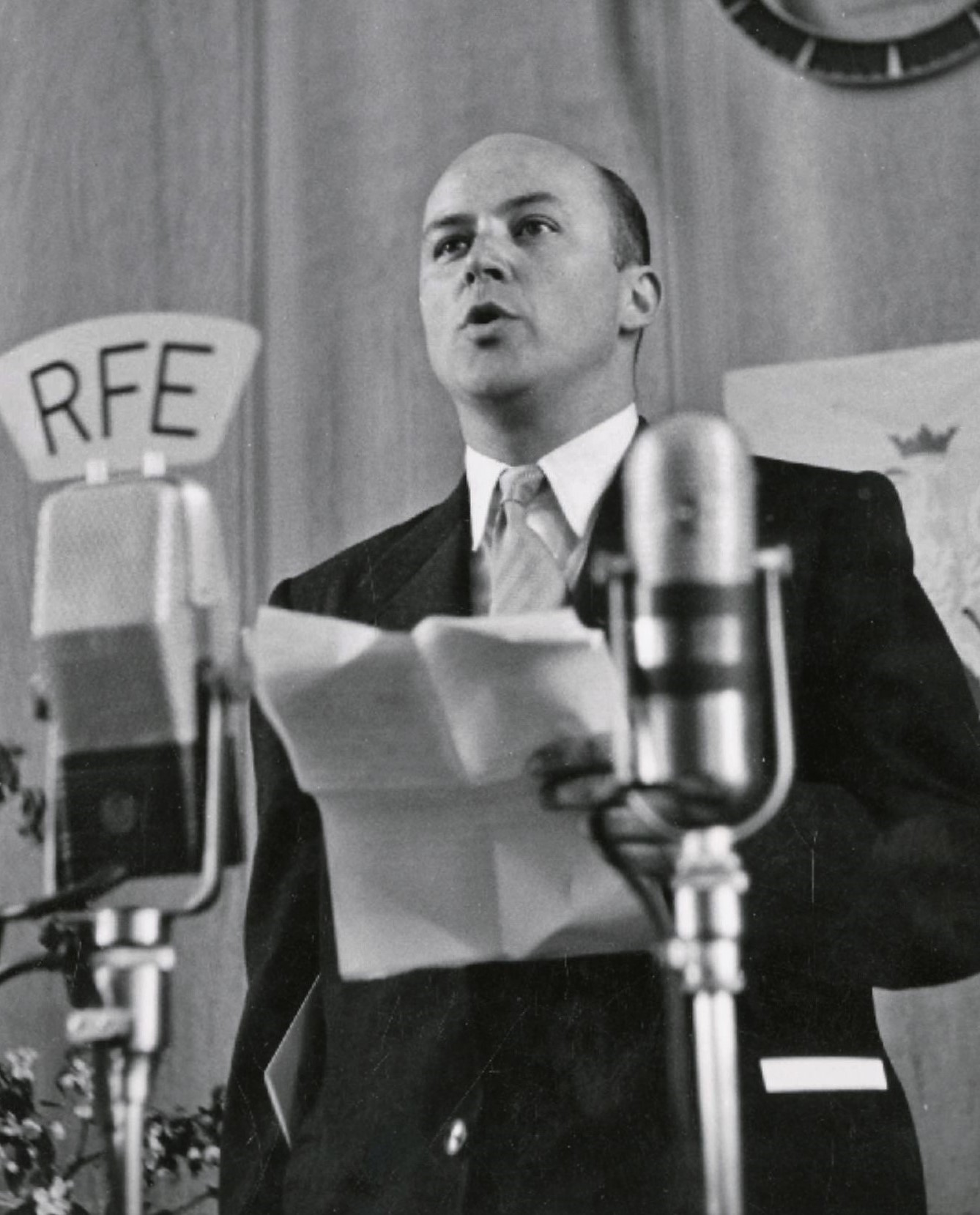
Jan Nowak-Jeziorański on Radio Free Europe, 3 May 1952

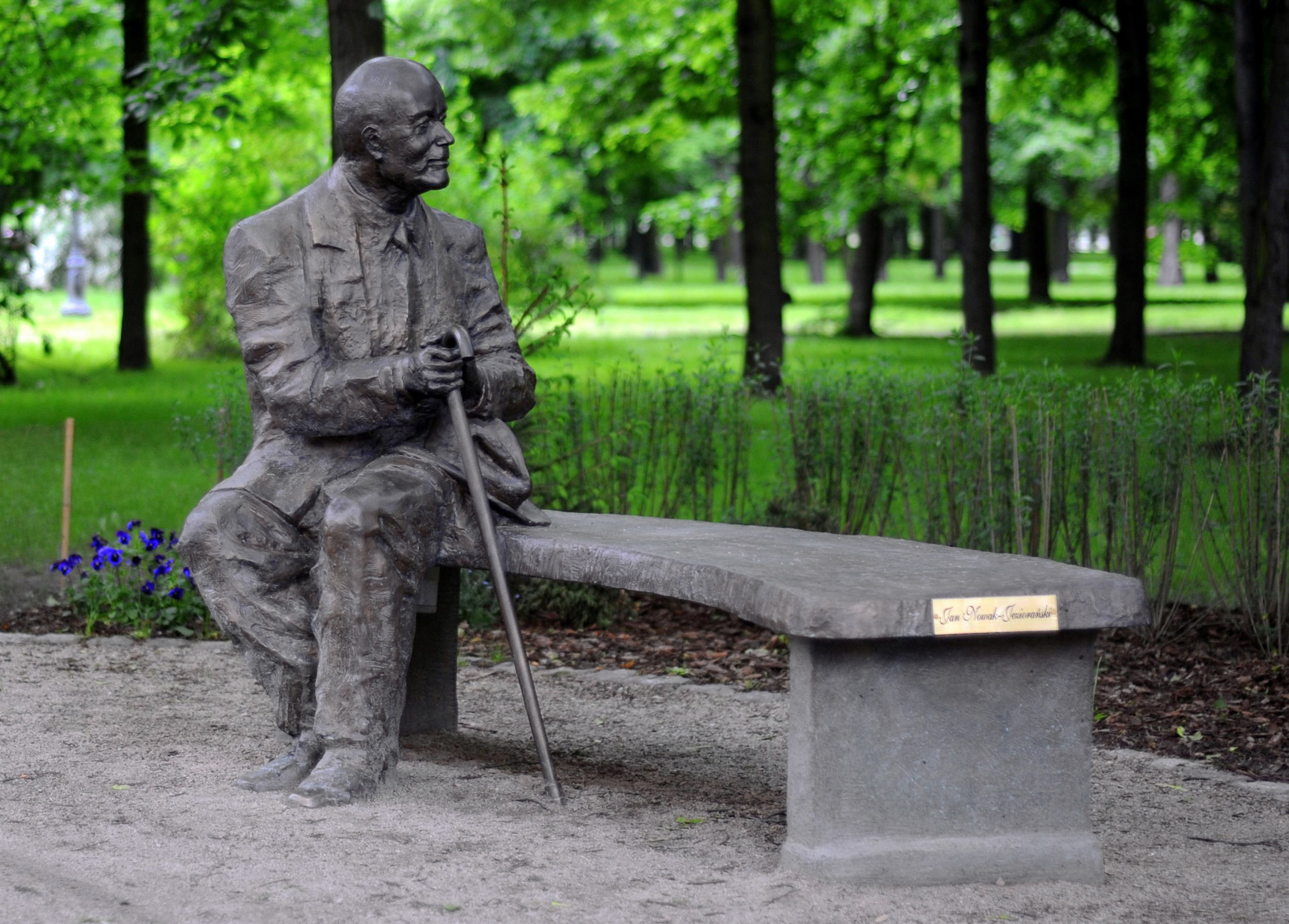
Monument to Jan Nowak-Jeziorański in Warsaw (bronze), sculptor: Wojciech Gryniewicz

Following the war Nowak-Jeziorański stayed in the West, initially in London and then in Munich and Washington. Between 1948 and 1976 he was one of the most notable personalities of the BBC Polish Section. In 1952 he also became head of the Polish section of the Munich-based Radio Free Europe. Through his daily radio broadcasts he remained one of the most popular radio personalities, both in communist-held Poland and among the Polish diaspora in the West. After giving up his posts in 1976 he became one of the most prominent members of the Polish American Congress. He was also working as an advisor to the American National Security Agency and the presidents of the USA Ronald Reagan and Jimmy Carter. Through his contacts with many notable politicians in the USA, he was one of the proponents of Poland's membership in NATO (achieved in 1999).

In the 1990s he started his cooperation with the Polish Radio and wrote a series of broadcasts titled Polska z oddali (Poland from a Distance). Since 1990 he was on Polish television as writer/presenter of monthly programs. In July 2002 he returned to Warsaw for the final time. He was an active supporter of Poland's entry into the European Union. Most of his books, published abroad as well as those published in Poland after 1989, were best-sellers and gained him even more popularity.

For his writings he was awarded some of the most prestigious Polish literary awards, including the Kisiel Award (1999), Ksawery Pruszyński Memorial Prize of the Polish Pen Club (2001) and the Superwiktor award for television personalities. In 2003 he was also awarded the Człowiek Pojednania prize by the Polish Council of Christians and Jews for his part in the Polish-Jewish dialogue. Finally, he was made the doctor honoris causa of many Polish universities, including the Warsaw University, Jagiellonian University and his alma mater, the Adam Mickiewicz University in Poznań.

He died in Warsaw on 20 January 2005 at the age of 90. He donated all his archives to the Ossolineum Institute.

== Censorship in Russia ==
A selection of Nowak's texts has been confiscated in Saint Petersburg, Russia by the FSB.

== Awards ==
- Knight's Cross of the Virtuti Militari (1944, highest Polish military award)
- Cross of Valour (Krzyż Walecznych)
- Officer's Cross of the Order of Polonia Restituta
- Commander's Cross with Star of the Order of Merit of the Polish Republic (1993)
- Order of the White Eagle (highest Polish award, 1994)
- Presidential Medal of Freedom (highest civilian award in the United States, 1996)
- Grand Cross of the Order of the Lithuanian Grand Duke Gediminas (the highest Lithuanian civilian award, 1998)
- King's Medal for Courage in the Cause of Freedom (United Kingdom)
- Kisiel Prize (1999)
- Lumen Mundi (2001)
- Ksawery Pruszyński Award (2001)
- Man of Reconciliation (2002), awarded by the Polish Council of Christians and Jews for his contribution to Christian-Jewish dialogue in Poland
- Wiktor Award and Superwiktor (2003) Awards of the Academy of Television
- Gold Statue of the Business Centre Club for his contribution to the development of Polish democracy awarded by Business Centre Club (2003)
- Honorary citizen of Warsaw, Gdansk and Kraków
- Prize. Xavier Pruszynski, granted by the Polish PEN Club
- Golden Microphone
- Diamond Microphone

== Bibliography ==
Among other books, he wrote:

- Polska droga ku wolnosci, 1952–1973, London, 1974. ISBN 0-901342-19-X
- Courier from Warsaw (Kurier z Warszawy, published in London 1978, Polish underground edition 1981, official edition in 1989, published in English in 1982 by Wayne State University Press) ISBN 0-8143-1725-1
- Ideological competition in United States' strategy, Polish American Congress, 1980.
- Polska została sobą, 1980. ISBN 0-902352-16-4
- Wojna w eterze (War on the Radio, memoirs 1948–1956), 1986. ISBN 0-903705-53-2
- Kryptonim "Odra" (Code-name Odra), Warsaw, 1986. ISBN 83-11-07358-9
- Polska z oddali. Wspomnienia 1956–1976 (Poland from the distance), 1988
- Poland and Germany (Occasional paper / East European Studies), Woodrow Wilson International Center for Scholars, 1991.
- Z dziejów Armii Krajowej w inspektoracie Płocko-Sierpeckim, Płock, 1992. ISBN 83-900609-0-6
- W poszukiwaniu nadziei (In Search for Hope), 1993
- Rozmowy o Polsce, Warsaw, 1995. ISBN 83-07-02466-8
- Polska wczoraj, dzis i jutro (Poland today, tomorrow and the day after), Warsaw, 1999. ISBN 83-07-02680-6
- Listy 1952–1998 (Letters 1952–1998), Wrocław, 2001. ISBN 83-7095-052-3
- Poland's Road to NATO, Towarzystwo Przyjaciół Ossolineum, Wrocław 2006, ISBN 83-7095-079-5

== In popular culture ==
A dramatic feature film about the wartime experiences of Nowak-Jeziorański and the Warsaw Uprising, entitled Kurier (The Messenger; U.S. title: The Resistance Fighter), was released in Poland in 2019 and in the United States in 2020. Directed by Polish filmmaker Władysław Pasikowski, it stars Philippe Tłokiński as Nowak-Jeziorański.

== See also ==
- Polish Underground State
