= Wojciech Gryniewicz =

Polish sculptor (1946–2026)

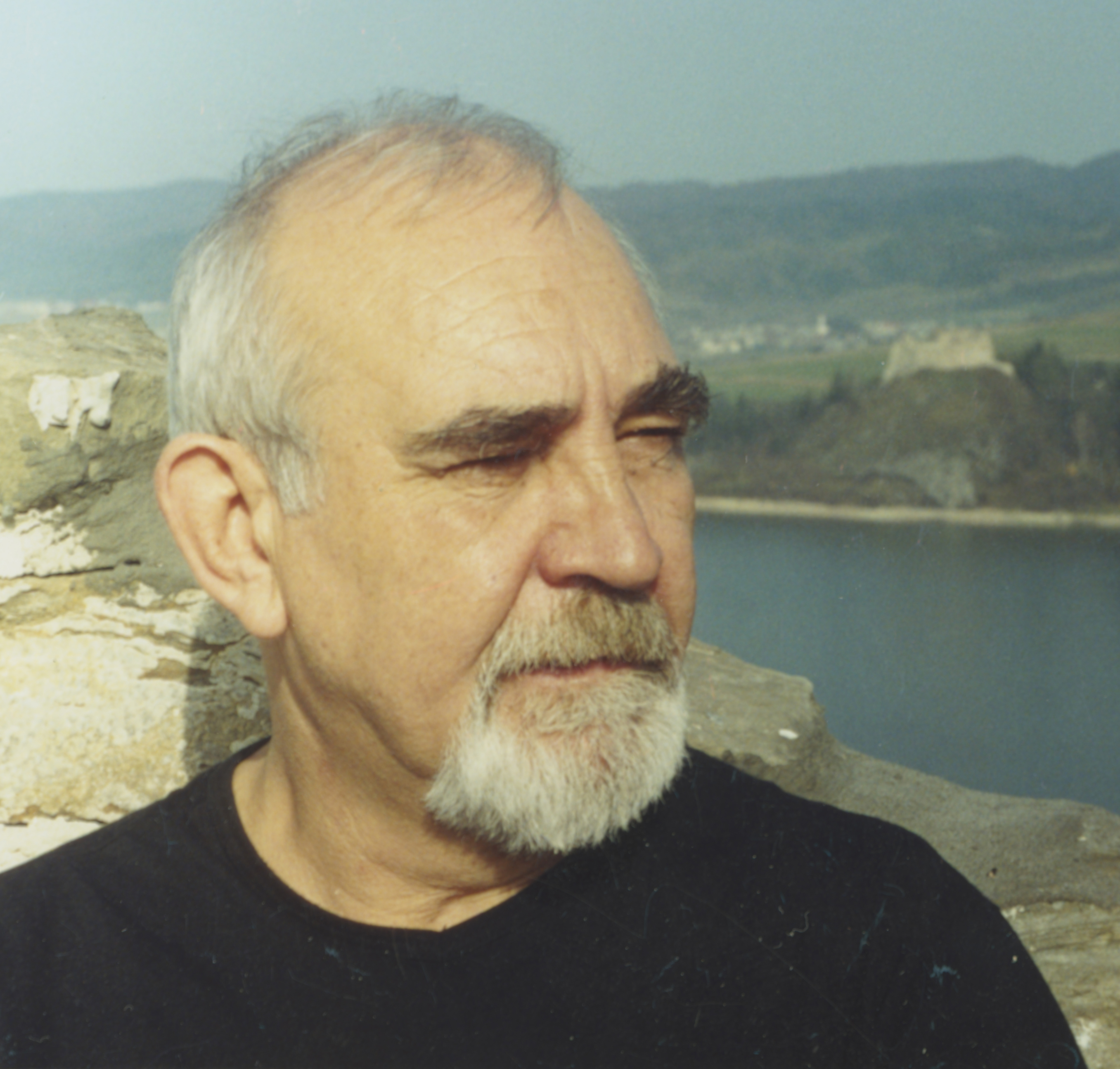
- Born: 5 April 1946; Bydgoszcz, Poland
- Died: 4 February 2026 (aged 79)
- Education: Academy of Fine Arts In Gdańsk
- Occupation: Sculptor

Wojciech Gryniewicz (5 April 1946 – 4 February 2026) was a Polish sculptor.

== Life and career ==
Gryniewicz graduated from State High School fine arts in Bydgoszcz and then studied at the Sculpture Department of the National Academy of Fine Arts in Gdańsk. He was a student of Alfred Wiśniewski and Adam Smolana.

Gryniewicz died on 4 February 2026, at the age of 79.

== Monuments ==
- Julian Tuwim Monument in Łódź (bronze), (1999)
- Monument to Jan Nowak-Jeziorański in Warsaw (bronze), (2006)
- School bench in Warsaw (bronze), 2006
- Monument to the victims of Communism in Łódź (bronze), 2009
- Father Jan Twardowski Monument in Warsaw (bronze), (2013)

== Television ==
- 2012: TVP- "Łódź kreatywna – WOJCIECH GRYNIEWICZ"

== Prizes ==
- 1975: Monument "Obrońcom Helu"– I Prize Ministry of Culture and National Heritage (Poland)
- 1985: "Ochrona zabytków Krakowa"– I Prize
- 2003: Monument to Julian Tuwim ("Ławeczka Tuwima")- The Best Art Sculptures 2003 – I Prize
- 2005: Monument to Julian Tuwim ("Ławeczka Tuwima")- Prize Poland's Travel, Ministry of Culture and National Heritage (Poland)

== Gallery ==
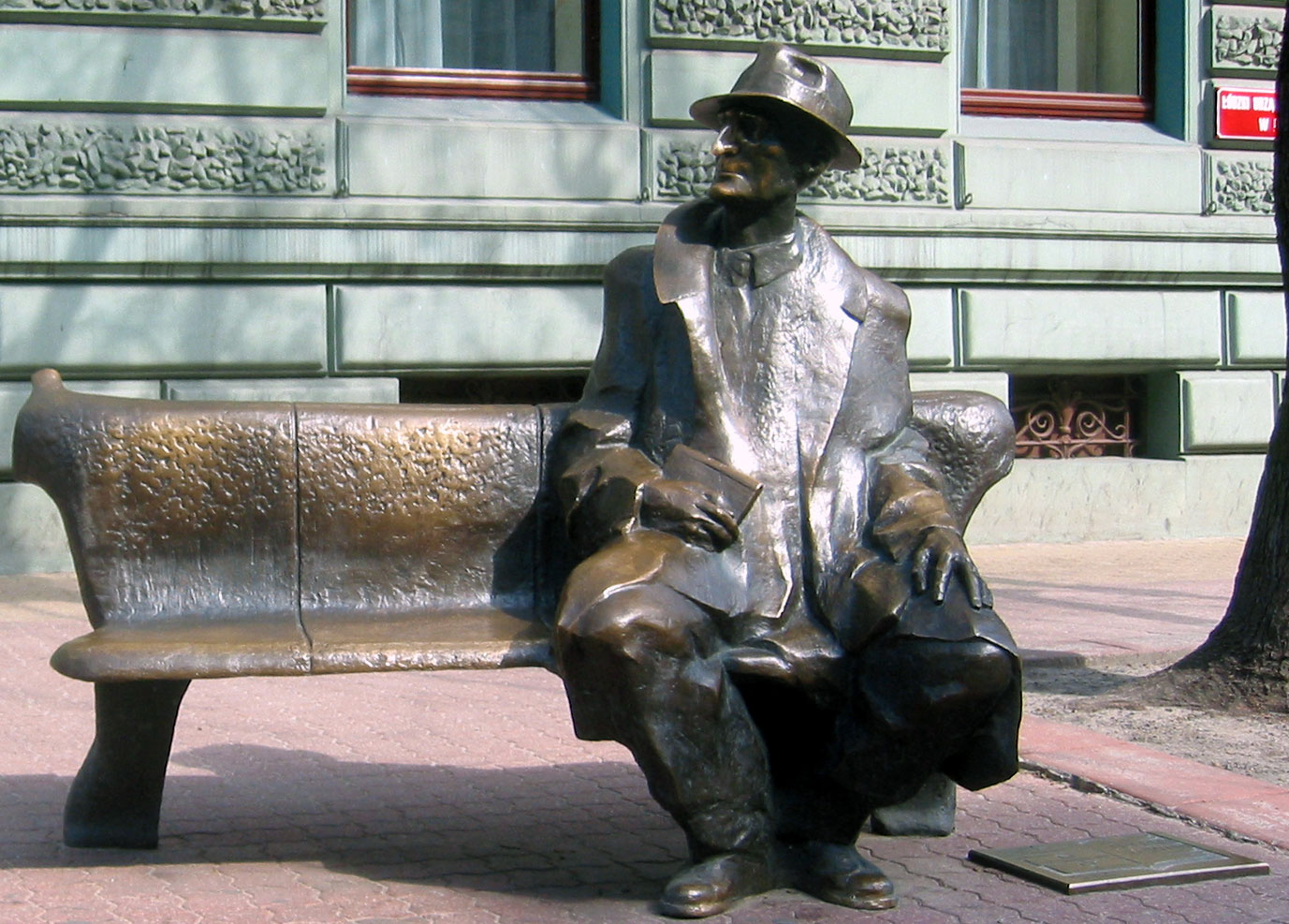
Tuwim's bench (bronze), 1999, exhibition in Łódź, Poland

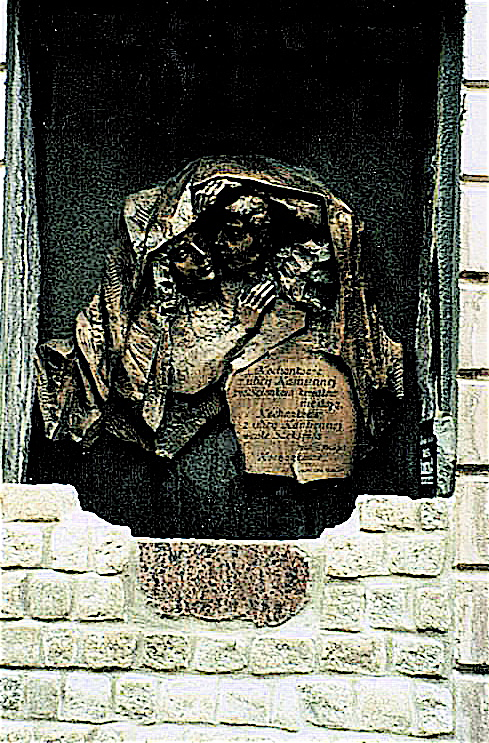
Lovers of Kamienna Street (bronze), 2004, exhibition in Łódź, Poland

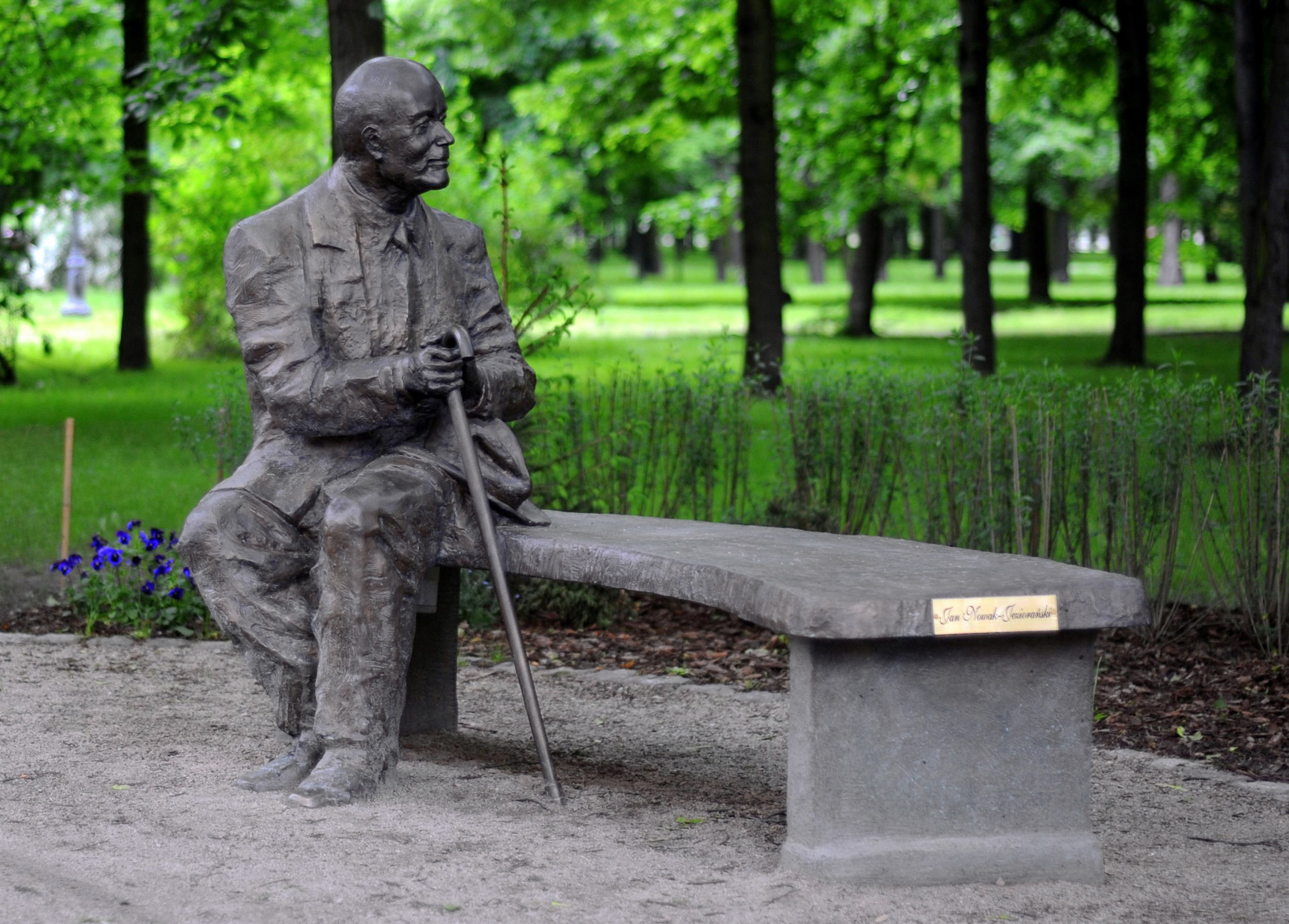
Monument to Jan Nowak-Jeziorański (bronze), 2006, exhibition in Warsaw, Poland

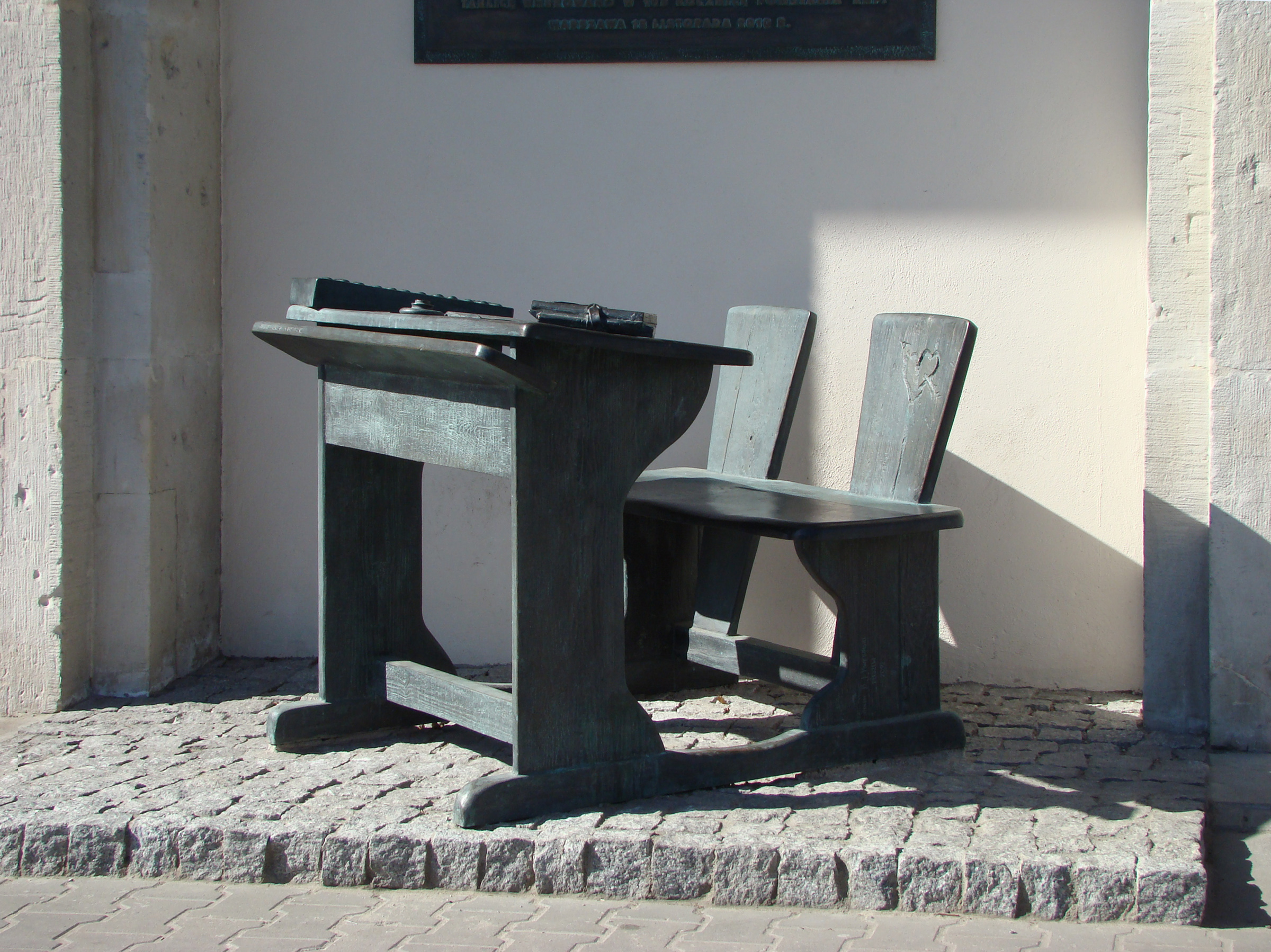
School bench (bronze), 2006, exhibition in Warsaw, Poland

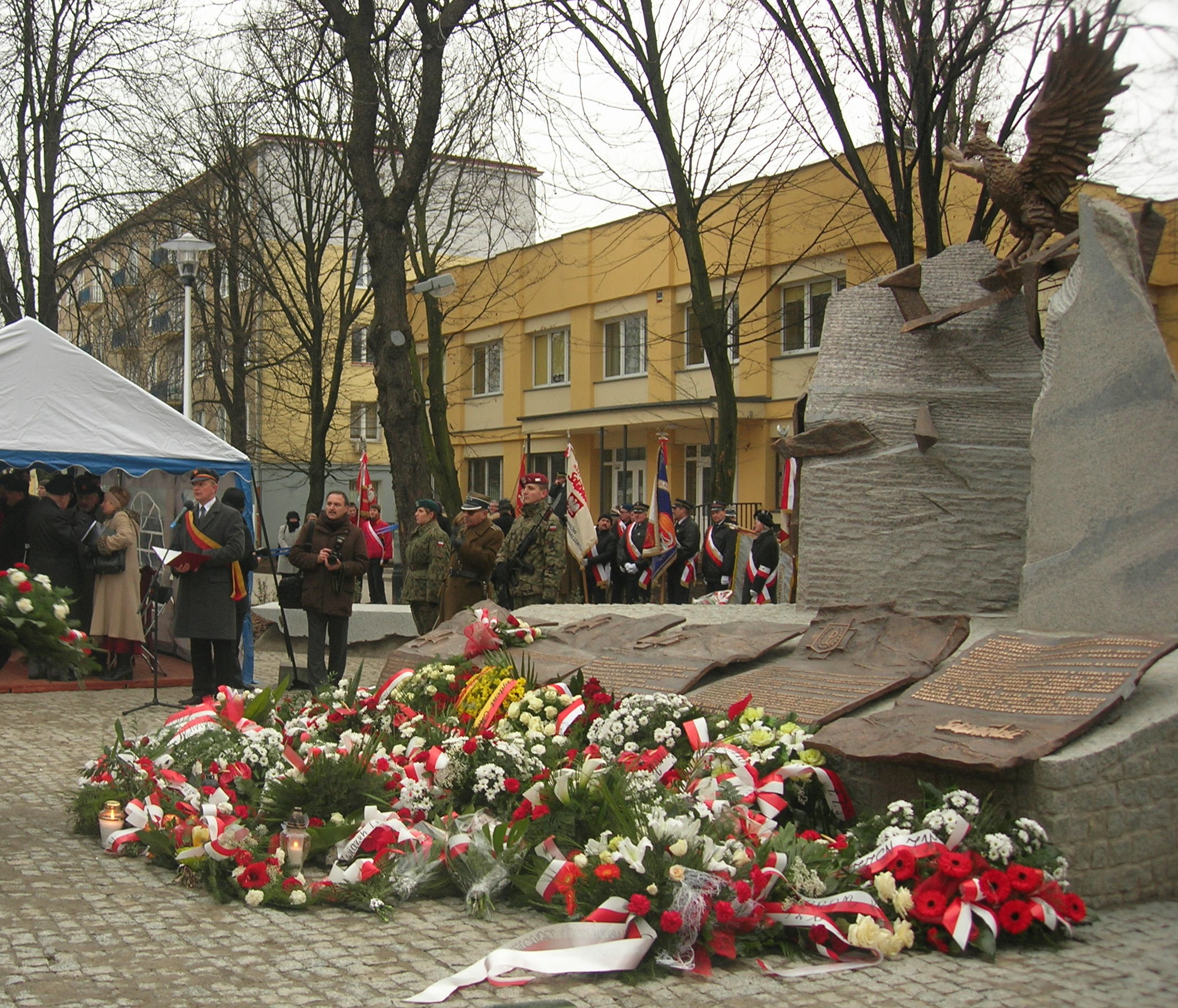
Monument to the victims of Communism (bronze), 2009, exhibition in Łódź, Poland

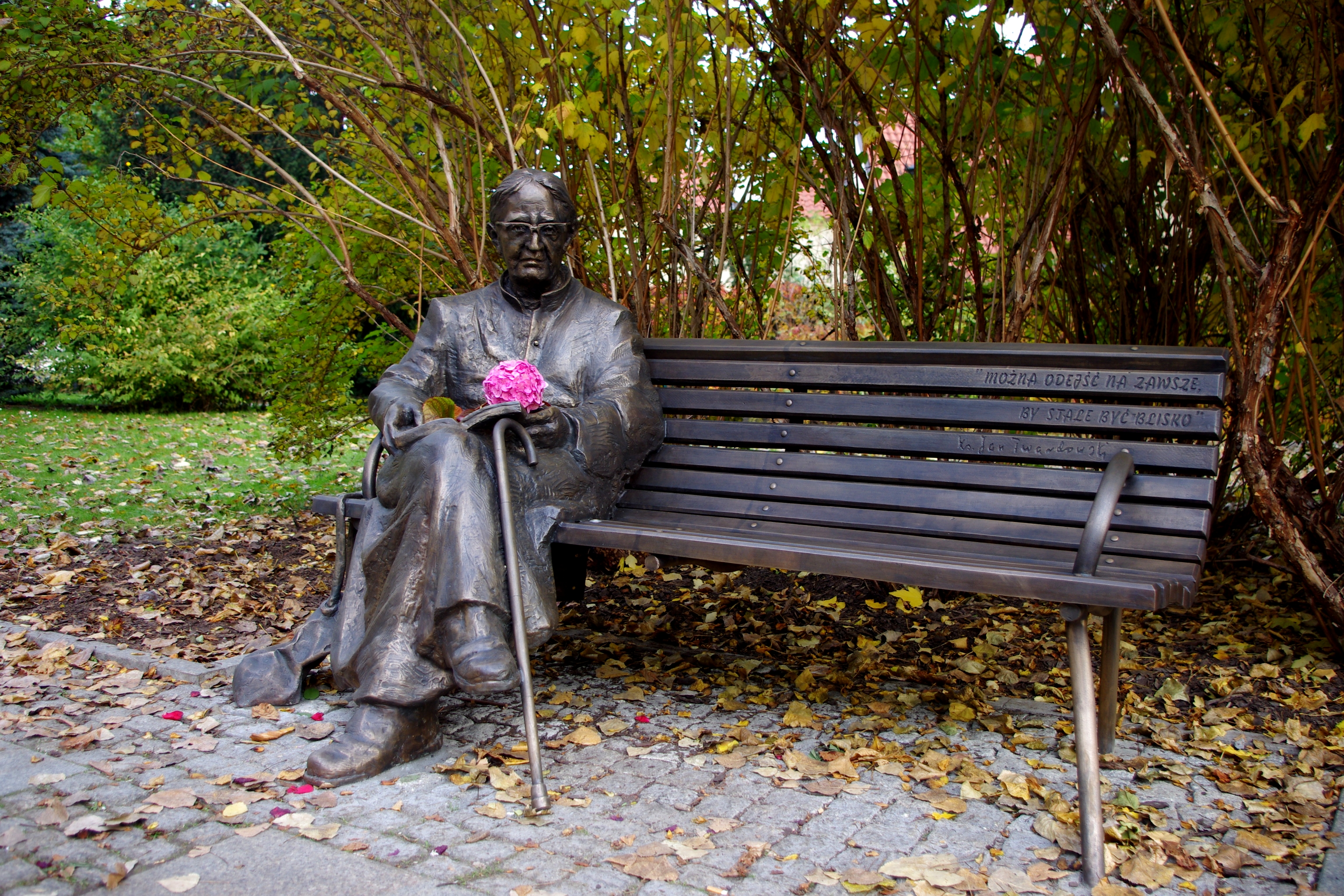
Monument to Jan Twardowski (bronze), 2013, Warsaw, Poland
