= Łódź =

City in central Poland

- City county
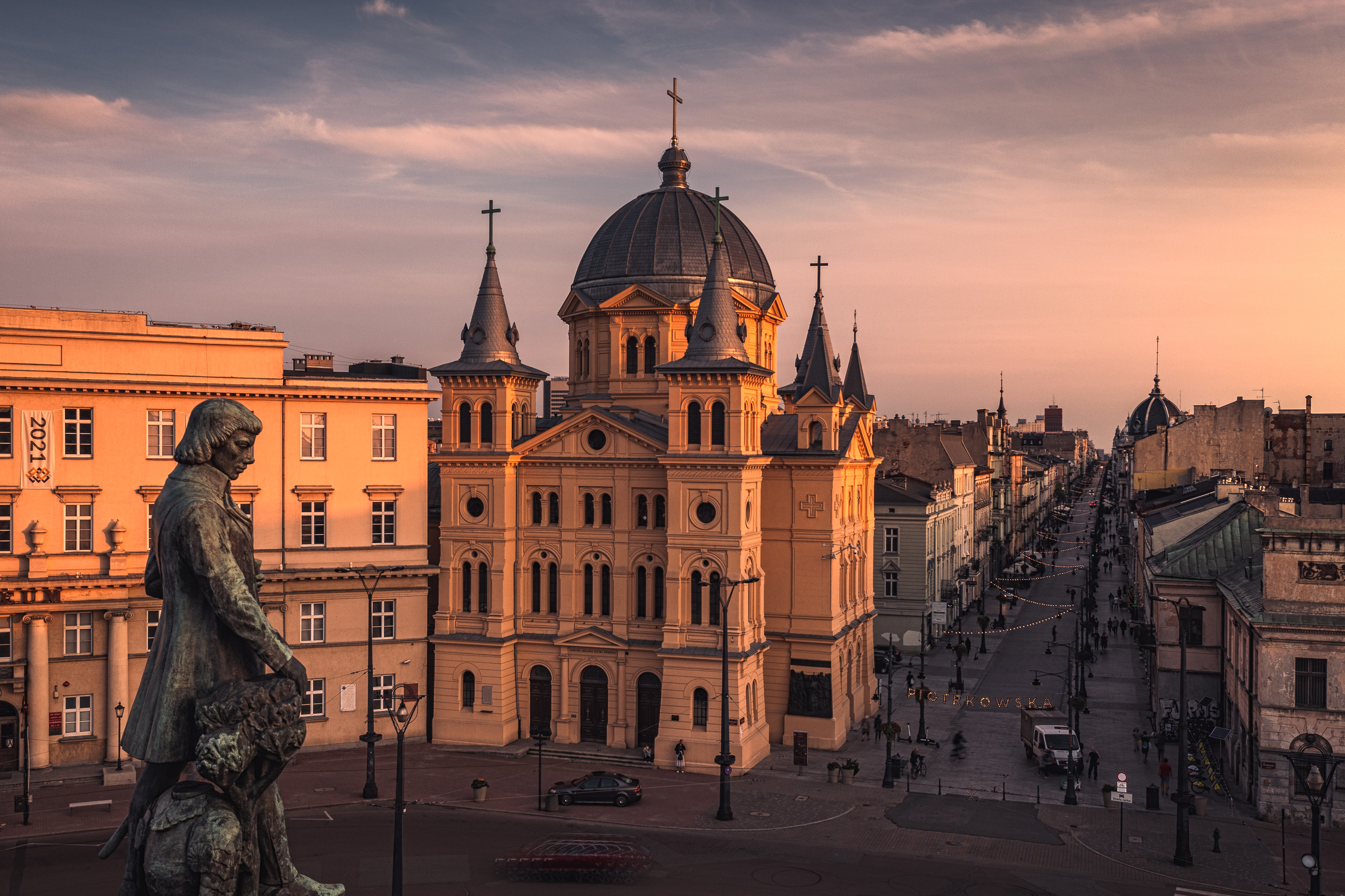
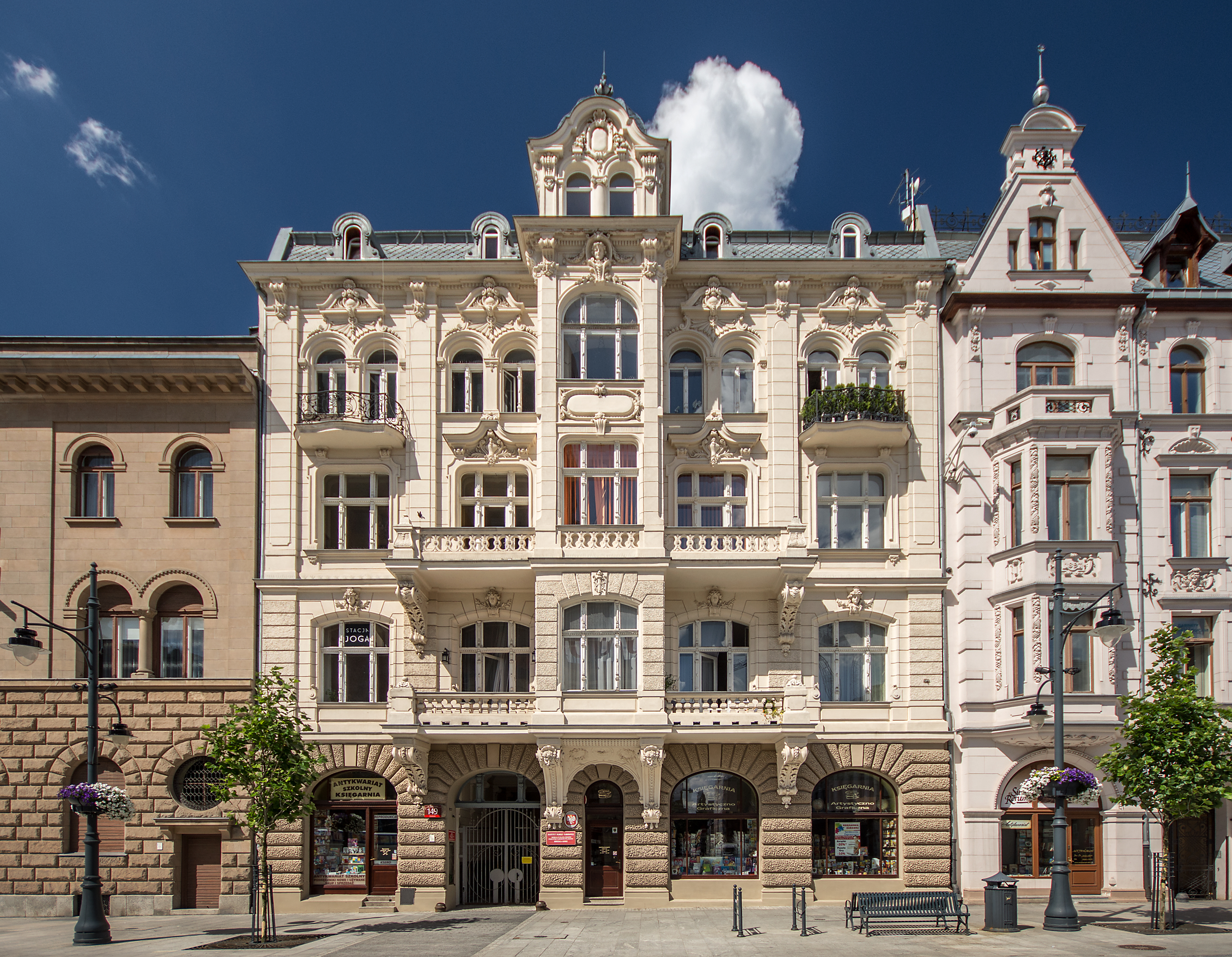
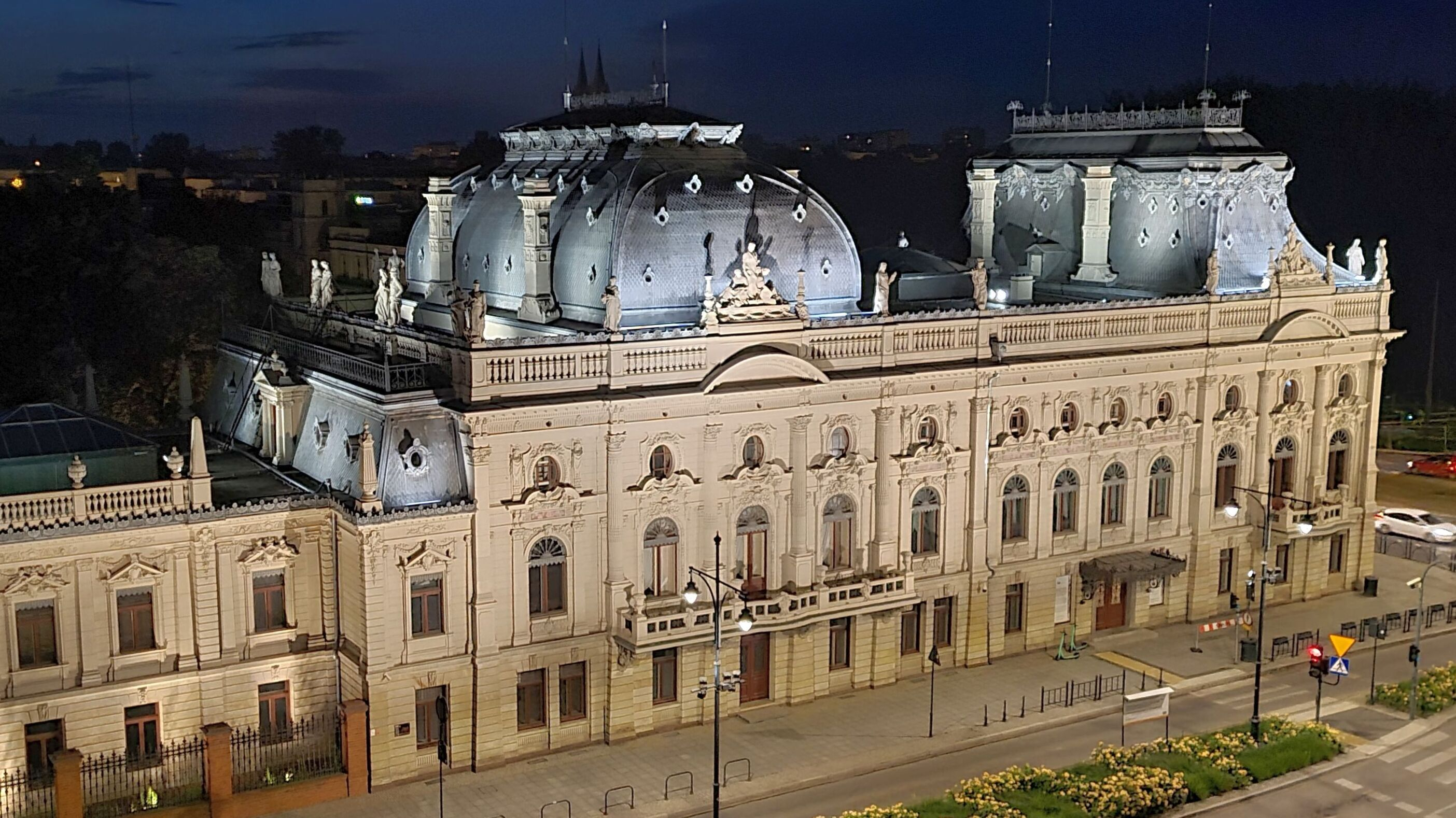
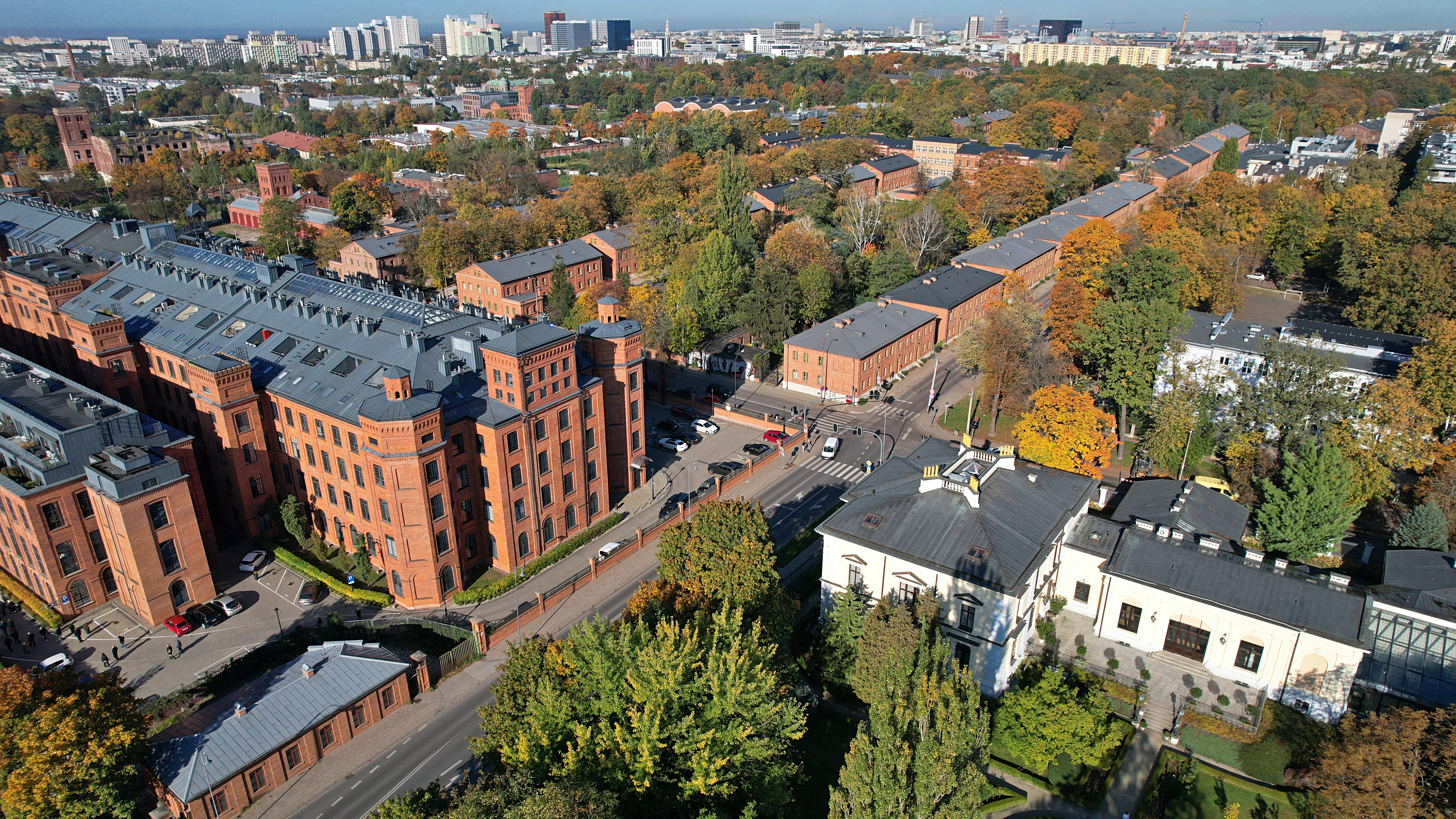
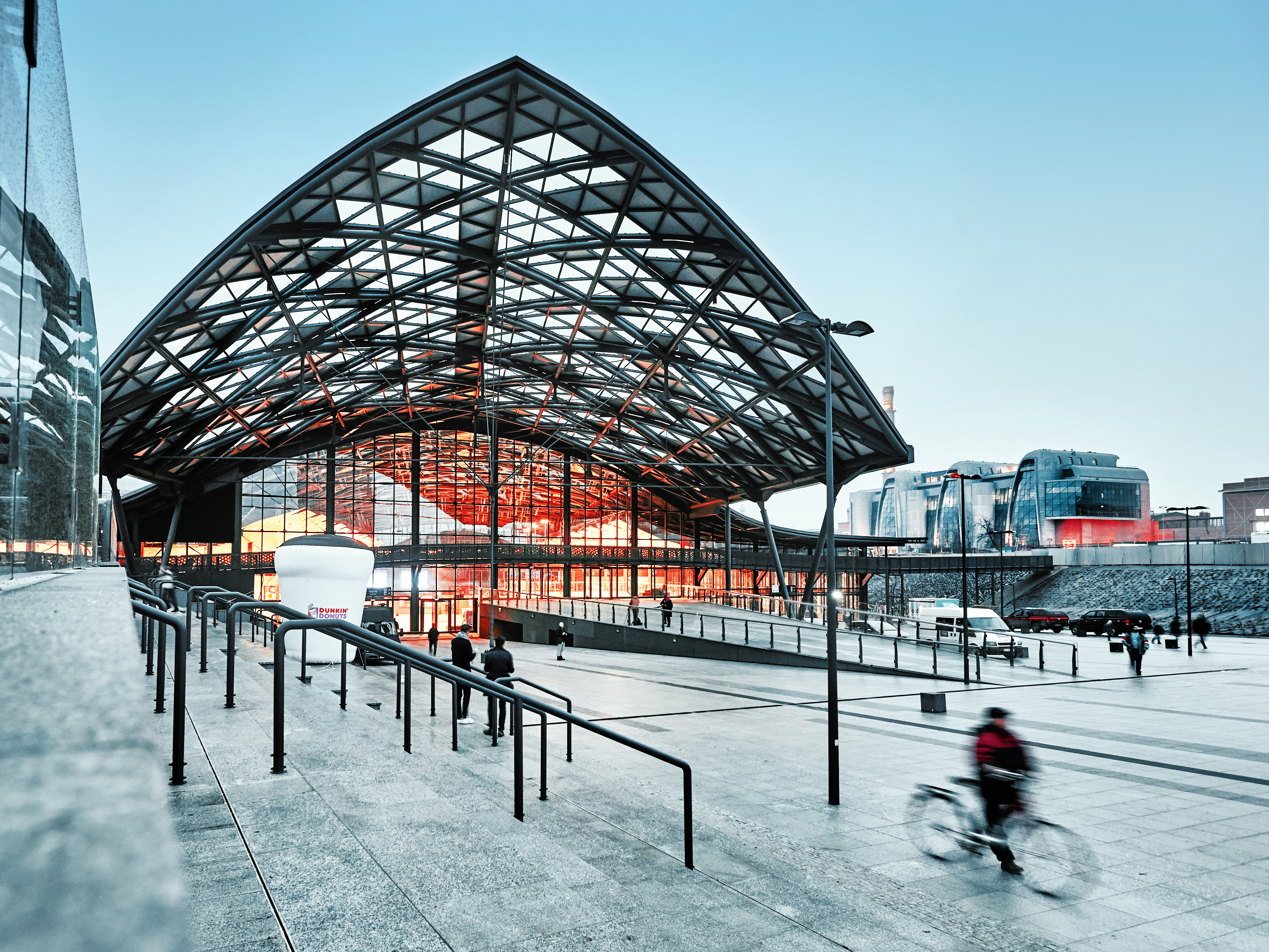
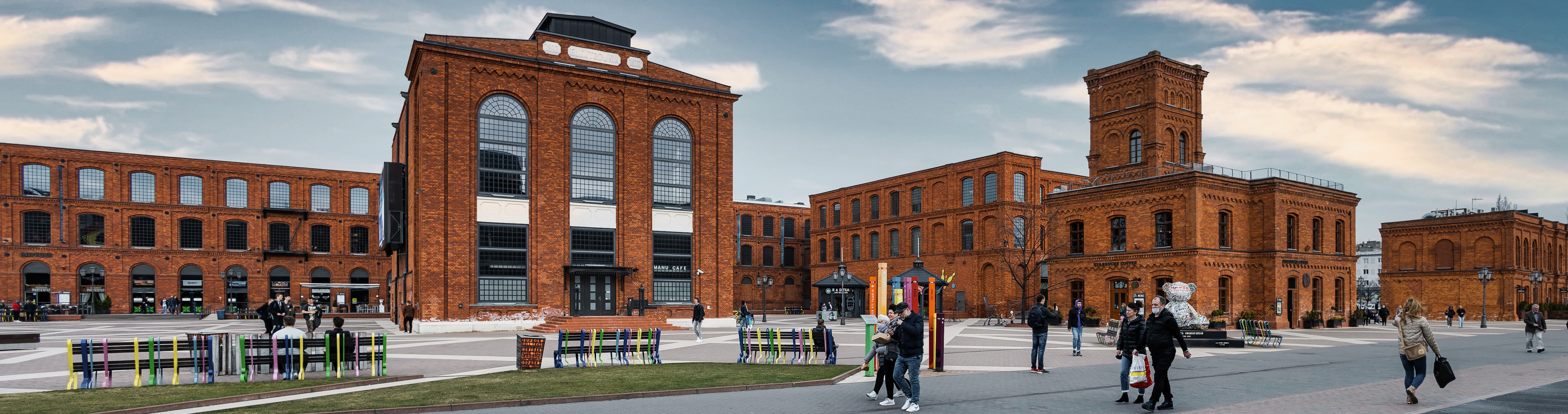
- Liberty Square — Plac Wolności Piotrkowska Street Izrael Poznański Palace Księży Młyn District Łódź Fabryczna Manufaktura

- Flag Coat of arms Wordmark
- Nickname: Ziemia Obiecana ('The Promised Land')
- Motto: Ex navicula navis ('From a boat a ship')
- Anthem: Prząśniczka by Stanisław Moniuszko
- Location within Poland
- Coordinates: 51°46′37″N 19°27′17″E
- Country: Poland
- Voivodeship: Łódź
- County: city county
- First mentioned: 1332
- City rights: 1423
- City Hall: Juliusz Heinzl Palace

Government
  - Body: Łódź City Council
  - City mayor: Hanna Zdanowska (KO)
  - Sejm of Poland: Łódź

Area
  - City county: 293.25 km^{2} (113.22 sq mi)
  - Metro: 2,496 km^{2} (964 sq mi)
- Highest elevation: 278 m (912 ft)
- Lowest elevation: 162 m (531 ft)

Population (31 December 2025)
  - City county: 639,890 ▼ (4th)
  - Density: 2,182.1/km^{2} (5,651.5/sq mi)
  - Metro: 1,100,000
  - Metro density: 440/km^{2} (1,100/sq mi)
- Demonym(s): łodzianin (male) łodzianka (female) (pl)

GDP
  - Metro: €18.415 billion (2021)
- Time zone: UTC+1 (CET)
  - Summer (DST): UTC+2 (CEST)
- Postal code: 90-001 to 94–413
- Area code: +48 42
- Vehicle registration: EL
- Primary airport: Łódź Władysław Reymont Airport
- Website: www.uml.lodz.pl

Łódź (Note: Pronunciation: British English: /ˈwʊtʃ/ WUUTCH; American English: /ˈwuːtʃ, ˈluːdʒ/ WOOTCH, LOOJ; Polish: [wut͡ɕ].; Other names: German: Lodz or Lodsch, both pronounced [lɔtʃ]; Latin: Lodzia.) is a city in central Poland and a former industrial centre. It is the capital of Łódź Voivodeship, and is located 120 km (75 mi) south-west of Warsaw. As of 2025, Łódź has a population of 639,890, making it the country's fourth largest city.

Łódź first appears in records in the 14th century. It was granted town rights in 1423 by the Polish King Władysław II Jagiełło and it remained a private town of the Kuyavian bishops and clergy until the late 18th century. In the Second Partition of Poland in 1793, Łódź was annexed to Prussia before becoming part of the Napoleonic Duchy of Warsaw; the city joined Congress Poland, a Russian client state, at the 1815 Congress of Vienna. The Second Industrial Revolution (from 1850) brought rapid growth in textile manufacturing and in population owing to the inflow of migrants, a sizable part of which were Jews and Germans. Ever since the industrialization of the area, the city had been multinational and struggled with social inequalities, as documented in the novel The Promised Land by Nobel Prize–winning author Władysław Reymont. The contrasts greatly reflected on the architecture of the city, where luxurious mansions coexisted with red-brick factories and dilapidated tenement houses.

The industrial development and demographic surge made Łódź one of the largest cities in Poland. During the interwar period, Łódź became an important centre for the Polish artistic avant-garde. Founded in 1931, Muzeum Sztuki became the first museum in Europe dedicated to collecting and showcasing modern art. Under the German occupation during World War II, the city's population was persecuted and its large Jewish minority was forced into a walled zone known as the Litzmannstadt Ghetto, after the Nazi German renaming of the city, from where they were sent to German concentration and extermination camps. The city became Poland's temporary seat of power in 1945.

Łódź experienced a sharp demographic and economic decline after 1989. It was only in the 2010s that the city began to experience revitalization of its neglected downtown area. Łódź is ranked by the Globalization and World Cities Research Network on the "Sufficiency" level of global influence. The city is internationally known for its National Film School, a cradle for the most renowned Polish actors and directors, including Andrzej Wajda and Roman Polański. In 2017, the city was inducted into the UNESCO Creative Cities Network and named UNESCO City of Film.

== Name and toponymy ==
There is no consensus on the origin of the city's name. The Polish word łódź means 'boat', but popular theories link it with the mediaeval village of Łodzia and the now-canalised River Łódka on which the modern city was founded. It may also be related to łoza 'willow tree' or the Old Polish personal name Włodzisław.

== History ==
=== Early beginnings (1332–1815) ===
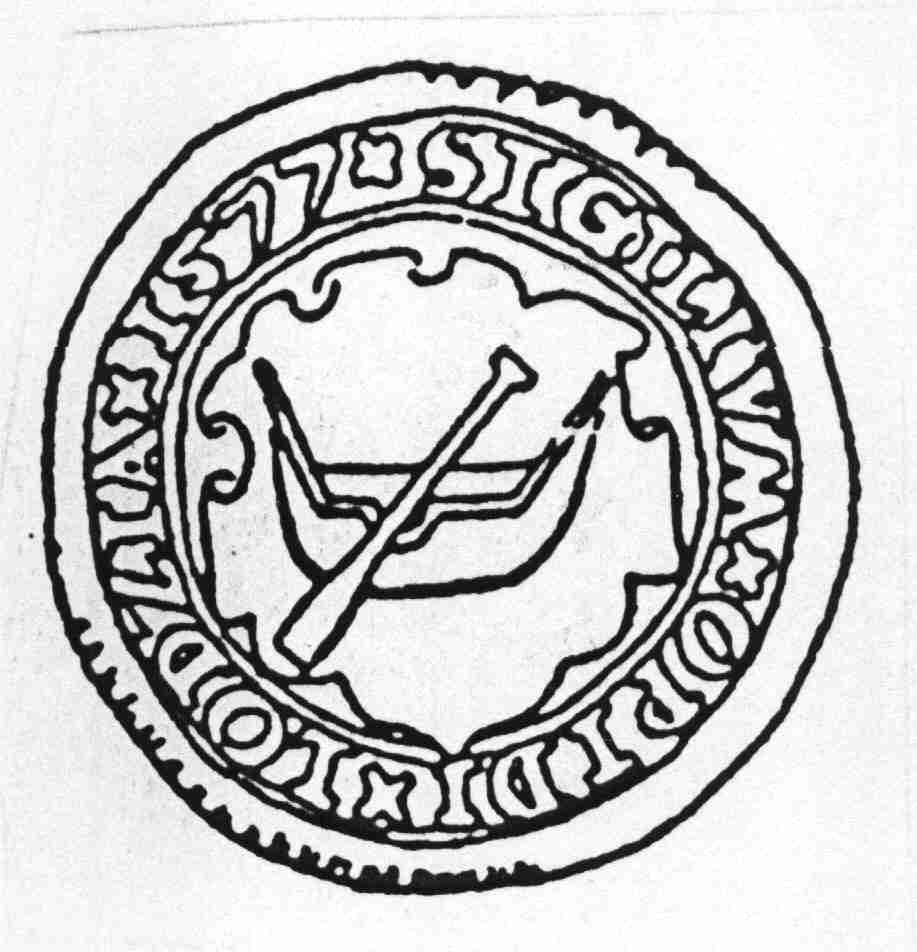
Sigillum oppidi Lodzia – seal dating back to 1577

Łódź first appears in a 1332 written record issued by Władysław the Hunchback, Duke of Łęczyca, which transferred the village of Łodzia to the Bishopric of Włocławek. The document enumerated the privileges of its inhabitants, notably the right to graze land, establish pastures and engage in logging. In 1423, King of Poland Władysław II Jagiełło officially granted town rights to the village under Magdeburg Law. For centuries, it remained a small remote settlement situated among woodlands and marshes, which was privately held by the Kuyavian bishops. It was administratively located in the Brzeziny County in the Łęczyca Voivodeship in the Greater Poland Province of the Kingdom of Poland. The economy was predominantly driven by agriculture and farming until the 19th century. The earliest two versions of the coat of arms appeared on seal emblems in 1535 and 1577, with the latter illustrating a boat-like vessel and a turned oar.

With the Second Partition of Poland in 1793, Łódź was annexed by Prussia. In 1798, the Kuyavian bishops' ownership over the region was formally revoked during the secularisation of church property. The town, governed by a burgomaster (burmistrz), at the time had only 190 residents, 44 occupied dwellings, a church and a prison. In 1806, Łódź was incorporated into the Napoleonic Duchy of Warsaw. In the aftermath of the 1815 Congress of Vienna, the duchy was dissolved and the town became part of the Congress Kingdom of Poland, a client state of the Russian Empire.

=== Partitions and development (1815–1918) ===
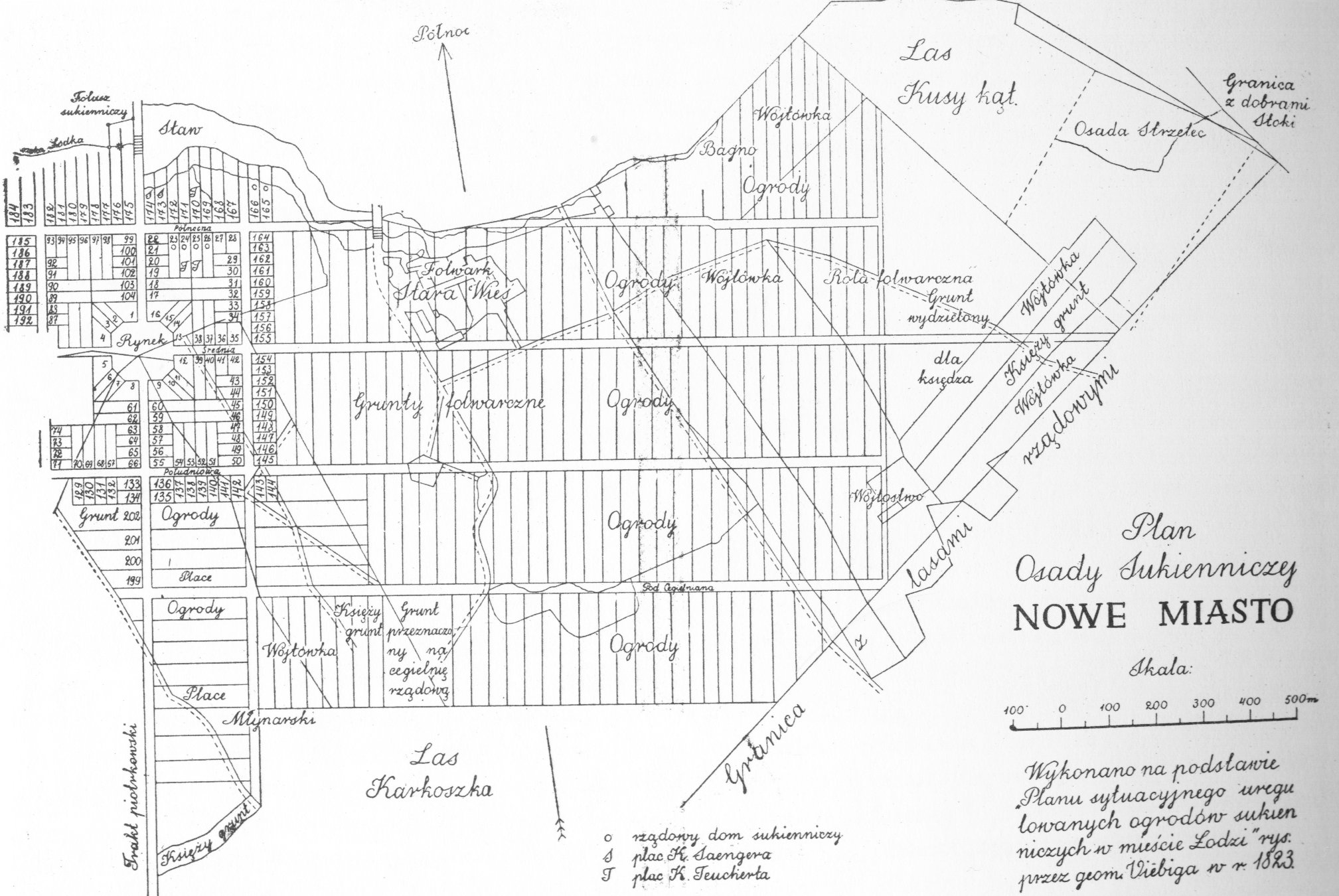
One of the first city plans, illustrating the housing allotments and new development around Piotrkowska Street, 1823

In 1820, the government of the Congress Kingdom designated Łódź and its rural surroundings for centrally planned industrial development. Rajmund Rembieliński, head of the Administrative Council and prefect of Masovia, became the president of a commission that subdivided the works two major phases; the first (1821–23) comprised the creation of a new city centre with an octagonal square (contemporary plac Wolności; Liberty Square) and arranged housing allotments on greenfield land situated south of the old marketplace; the second stage (1824–28) involved the establishment of cotton mill colonies and a linear street system along with an arterial north–south thoroughfare, Piotrkowska. Many of the early dwellings were timber cottages built for housing weavers (domy tkaczy).

During this time, a sizeable number of German craftsmen settled in the city, encouraged by exemptions from tax obligations. Their settlement in Poland was encouraged by renowned philosopher and statesman Stanisław Staszic, who acted as the director of the Department of Trade, Crafts and Industry.

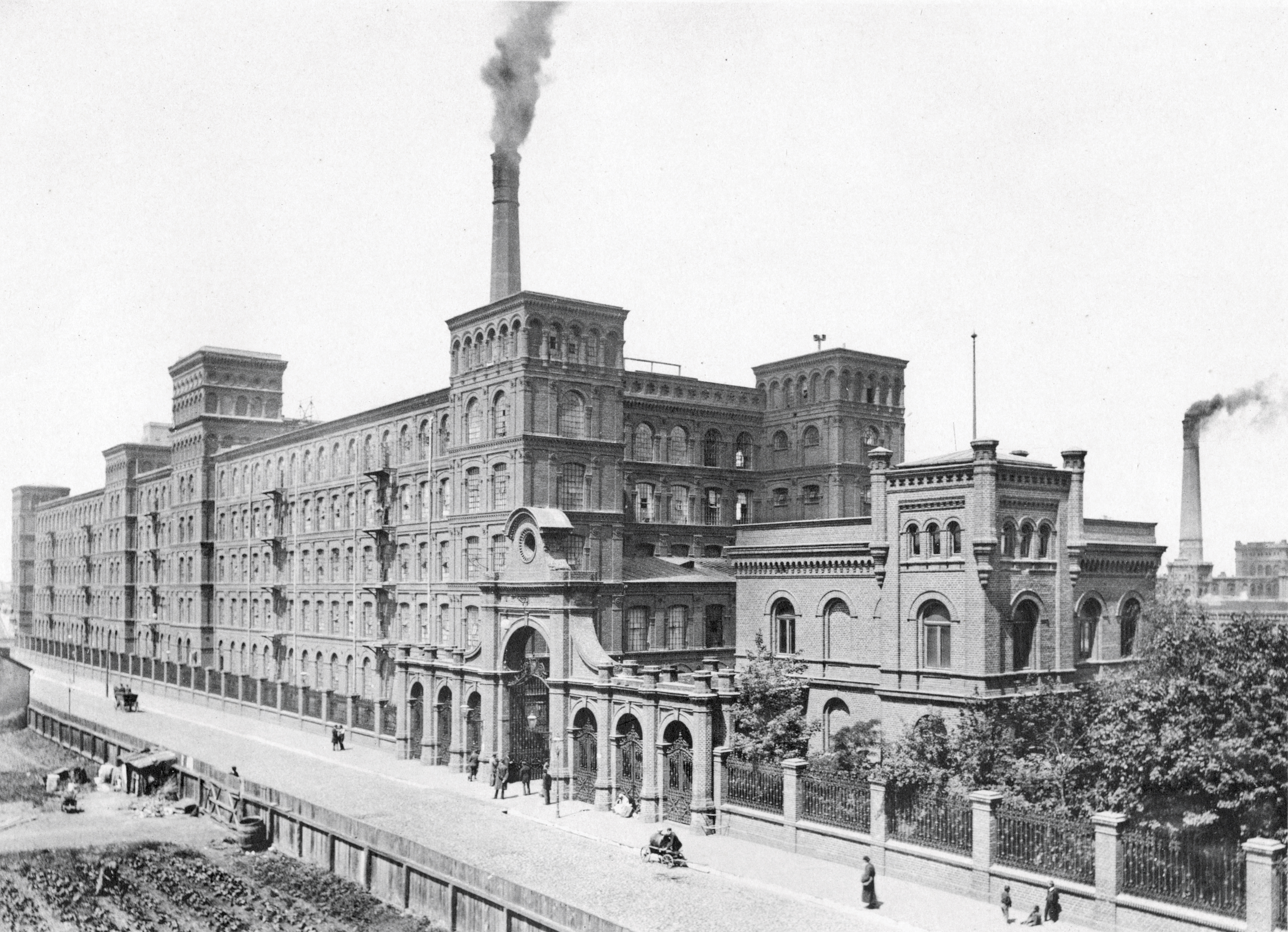
Izrael Poznański's industrial complex (Manufaktura) pictured in 1895

In 1851, the Russian imperial authorities abolished a customs barrier which was imposed on Congress Poland following the failed November Uprising (1830–1831). The suppression of tariffs allowed the city to freely export its goods to Russia, where the demand for textiles was high. Poland's first steam-powered loom commenced operations at Ludwik Geyer's White Factory in 1839. During the first weeks of the January Uprising (1863–1864), a unit of 300 Polish insurgents entered the city without resistance and seized weapons, and later on, there were also clashes between Polish insurgents and Russian troops in the city. In 1864, the inhabitants of adjacent villages were permitted to settle in Łódź without restrictions. The development of railways in the region was also instrumental in expanding the textile industry; in 1865 the Łódź–Koluszki line, a branch of the Warsaw–Vienna railway, was opened, thus providing a train connection to larger markets. In 1867, the city was incorporated into the Piotrków Governorate, a local province.

The infrastructure and edifices of Łódź were built at the expense of industrialists and business magnates, chiefly Karl Wilhelm Scheibler and Izrael Poznański, who sponsored schools, hospitals, orphanages, and places of worship. From 1872 to 1892, Poznański established a major textile manufactory composed of twelve factories, power plants, worker tenements, a private fire station, and a large eclectic palace. By the end of the century, Scheibler's Księży Młyn became one of Europe's largest industrial complexes, employing 5,000 workers within a single facility. The years 1870–1890 saw the most intense industrialisation, which was marked by social inequalities and dire working conditions. Łódź soon became a notable centre of the socialist movement and the so-called Łódź rebellion^{(pl)} in May 1892 was quelled by a military intervention.

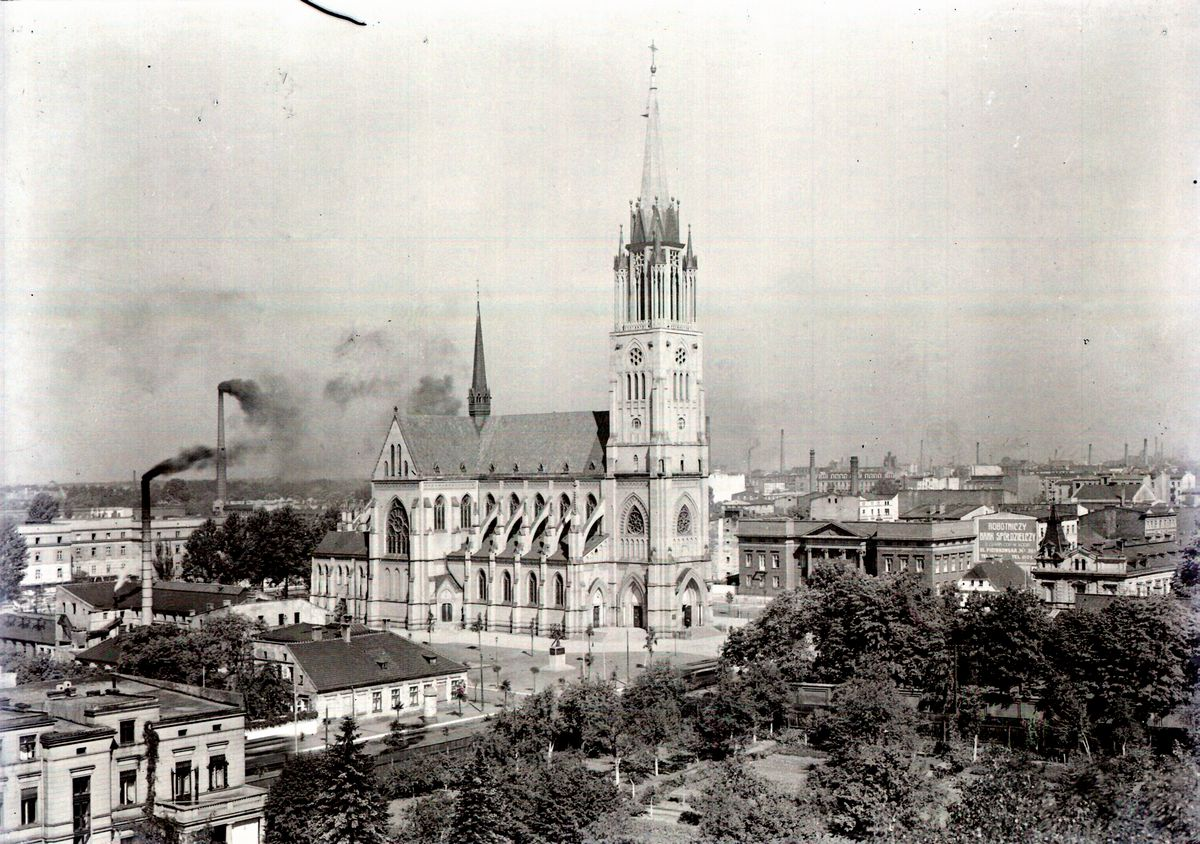
The Archcathedral of St. Stanislaus Kostka, completed in 1912, is one of Poland's tallest churches.

The turn of the 20th century coincided with cultural and technological progress; in 1899, the first stationary cinema in Poland (Gabinet Iluzji) was opened in Łódź. In the same year, Józef Piłsudski, the future Marshal of Poland, settled in the city and began printing the Robotnik (The Worker; p. 1894–1939), an underground newspaper published by the Polish Socialist Party. During the June Days (1905), approximately 100,000 unemployed labourers went on a mass strike, barricaded the streets and clashed with troops. Officially, 151 demonstrators were killed and thousands were wounded. In 1912, the Archcathedral of St. Stanislaus Kostka was completed and its tower at 104 metres (341 ft) is one of the tallest in Poland.

Despite the impending crisis preceding World War I, Łódź grew exponentially and was one of the world's most densely populated industrial cities, with a population density of 13,200 inhabitants per square kilometre (34,000/sq mi) by 1914. In the aftermath of the Battle of Łódź (1914), the city came under Imperial German occupation on 6 December. With Polish independence restored in November 1918, the local population disarmed the German army. Subsequently, the textile industry of Łódź stalled and its population briefly decreased as ethnic Germans left the city.

=== Restored Poland (1918–1939) ===
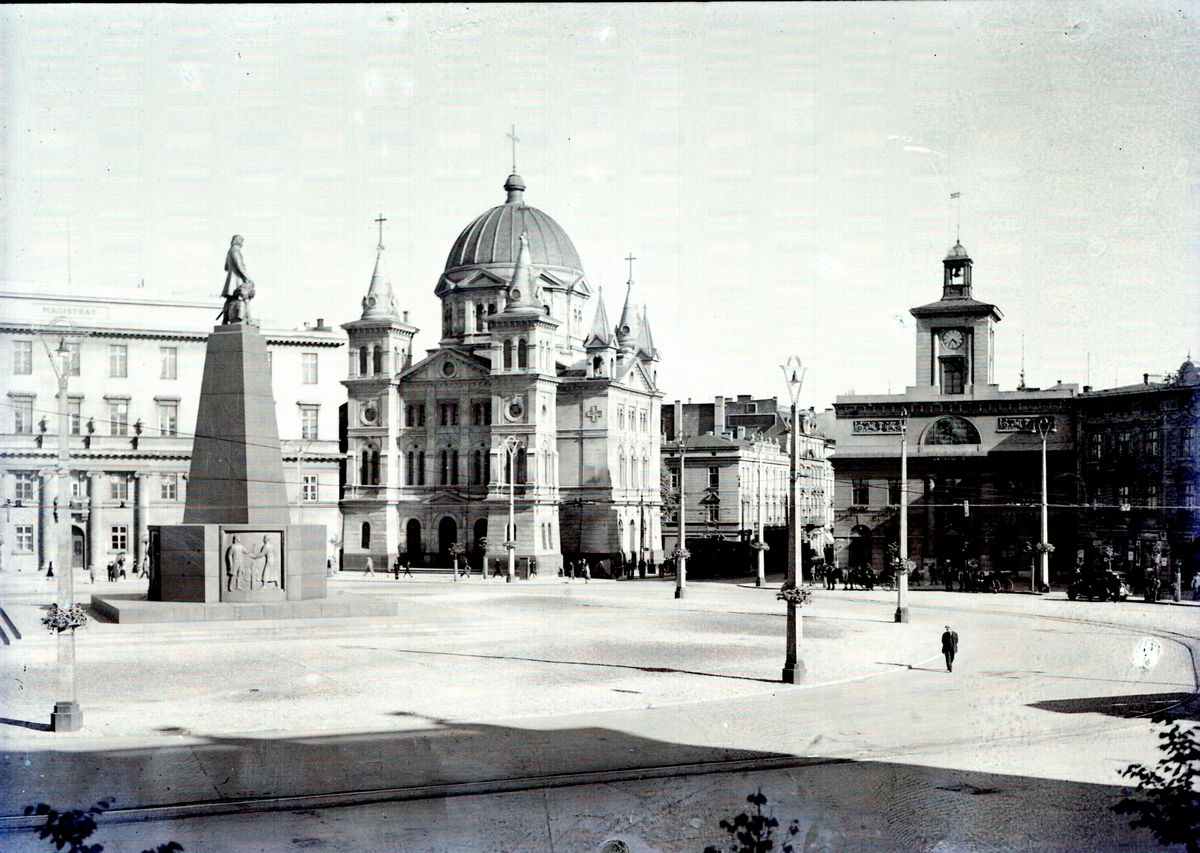
Plac Wolności (Liberty Square) with the Tadeusz Kościuszko Monument and Holy Spirit Church in 1930

Despite its large population and economic output, Łódź did not serve as the seat of its province until the 20th century. Following the establishment of the Second Polish Republic, it became the capital of the Łódź Voivodeship in 1919. The early interwar period was characterised by considerable economic hardship and industrial stagnation. The Great Depression and the German–Polish customs war closed western markets to Polish textiles while the Bolshevik Revolution and the Civil War in Russia put an end to the most profitable trade with the East.

Because of rapid and, consequently, chaotic development in the previous century, Łódź did not possess the adequate infrastructure and living standards for its inhabitants. Pollution was acute, sanitary conditions were poor and the authorities did not invest in a sewage treatment system until the 1920s. From 1918 to 1939, many cultural, educational and scientific institutions were created, including elementary schools, museums, art galleries and public libraries which prior to the First World War did not exist. Łódź also began developing an entertainment scene, with 34 movie theatres opened by 1939. On 13 September 1925, the city's first airport, Lublinek, commenced operations. In 1930, the first radio transmission from a newly founded broadcasting station took place.

The ideological orientation of Łódź was strongly left-wing and the city was a notable centre of socialist, communist and bundist activity in Polish politics during the interbellum.

=== Second World War (1939–1945) ===
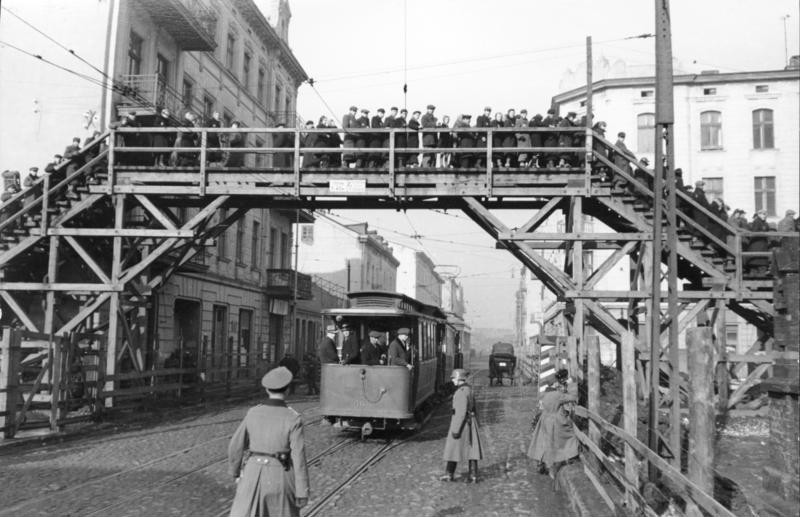
Łódź Ghetto (Ghetto Litzmannstadt), was the second-largest ghetto in all of German-occupied Europe.

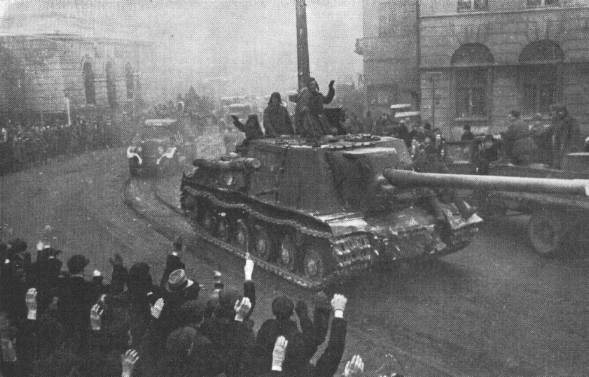
Residents of Łódź greet the Red Army during the city's liberation in 1945.

During the invasion of Poland in September 1939, the Polish forces of General Juliusz Rómmel's Army Łódź defended the city against the German assault by forming a line of resistance between Sieradz and Piotrków Trybunalski. The attack was conducted by the 8th Army of Johannes Blaskowitz, who encircled the city with the X Army Corps. After fierce resistance, a Polish delegation surrendered to the Germans on 8 September, and the first Wehrmacht troops entered in the early hours of 9 September. The German Einsatzgruppe III paramilitary death squad entered the city on 12 September. Arthur Greiser incorporated Łódź into a new administrative subdivision of Nazi Germany called Reichsgau Wartheland on 9 November 1939, and on 11 April 1940 the city was renamed to Litzmannstadt after German general and NSDAP member Karl Litzmann.

The city became subjected to immediate Germanisation, with Polish and Jewish establishments closed, and Polish-language press banned. Low-wage forced labour was imposed on the city's inhabitants aged 16 to 60; many were subsequently deported to Germany. As part of the Intelligenzaktion, Polish intellectuals from the city and region were imprisoned at Radogoszcz and then either sent to concentration camps or murdered in the forests of Łagiewniki and the village of Lućmierz-Las. Polish children were forcibly taken from their parents, and from 1942 to 1945 the German Sicherheitspolizei operated a camp for kidnapped Polish children from various regions in Łódź.

The German authorities established the Łódź Ghetto (Ghetto Litzmannstadt) in the city and populated it with more than 200,000 Jews from the region, who were systematically sent to German extermination camps. It was the second-largest ghetto in occupied Europe, and the last major ghetto to be liquidated, in August 1944. The Polish resistance movement (Żegota) operated in the city and aided the Jewish people throughout its existence. However, only 877 Jews were still alive by 1945. Of the 223,000 Jews in Łódź before the invasion, 10,000 survived the Holocaust in other places. The Germans also created camps for non-Jews, including the Romani people deported from abroad, who were ultimately murdered at Chełmno, as well as a penal forced labour camp, four transit camps for Poles expelled from the city and region, and a racial research camp.

=== Post World War II (1945–1989) ===
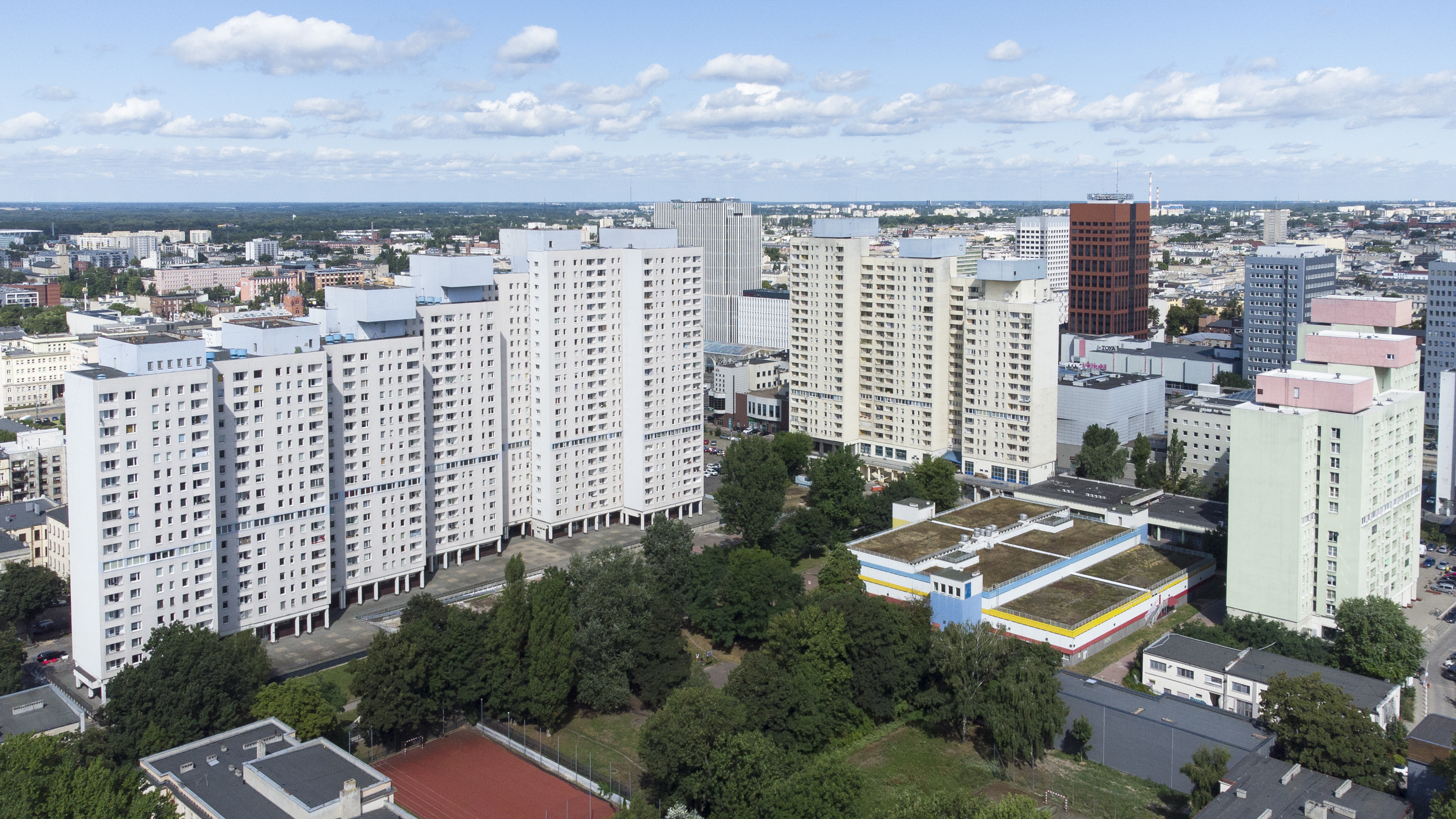
Śródmieście Residential District - built in 1975–1982, one of many modernist housing estates from the times of the Polish People's Republic

Following liberation by Soviet forces on 19 January 1945, and the end of the World War II, Łódź informally and temporarily took over the functions of Poland's capital, and most of the government and country administration resided in the city prior to the reconstruction of Warsaw.

Łódź also experienced an influx of refugees from Kresy. Many migrated into the suburbs and occupied the empty properties. Under the Polish People's Republic, the city's industry and private companies were subject to nationalisation. On 24 May 1945, the University of Łódź was inaugurated. On 8 March 1948, the National Film School was opened, later becoming Poland's primary academy of drama and cinema.

The spatial and urban planning after World War II was conducted in accordance with the Athens Charter, where the population from the old core was relocated into new residential areas. However, as a result, the inner-city and historical areas fell in significance and degenerated into a slum. A number of extensive panel block housing estates were constructed, including Retkinia, Teofilów, Widzew, Radogoszcz, and Chojny. These block housing estates were constructed between 1960 and 1990, covering an area of almost 30 square kilometres (12 sq mi) and accommodating a large part of the populace.

In mid-1981 Łódź became famous for its massive hunger demonstration of local mothers and their children.

=== Contemporary history (1990–present) ===
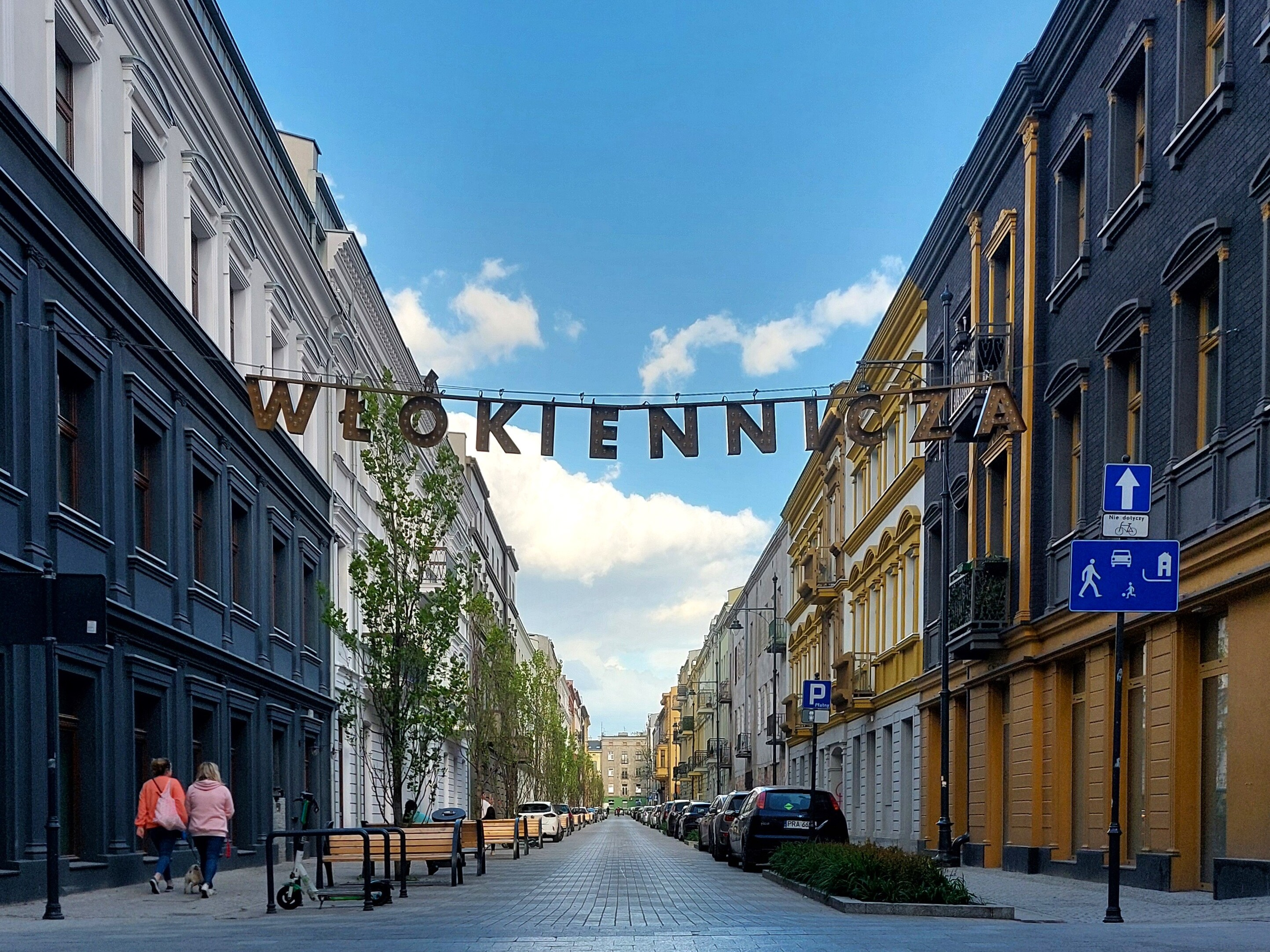
Włókiennicza Street

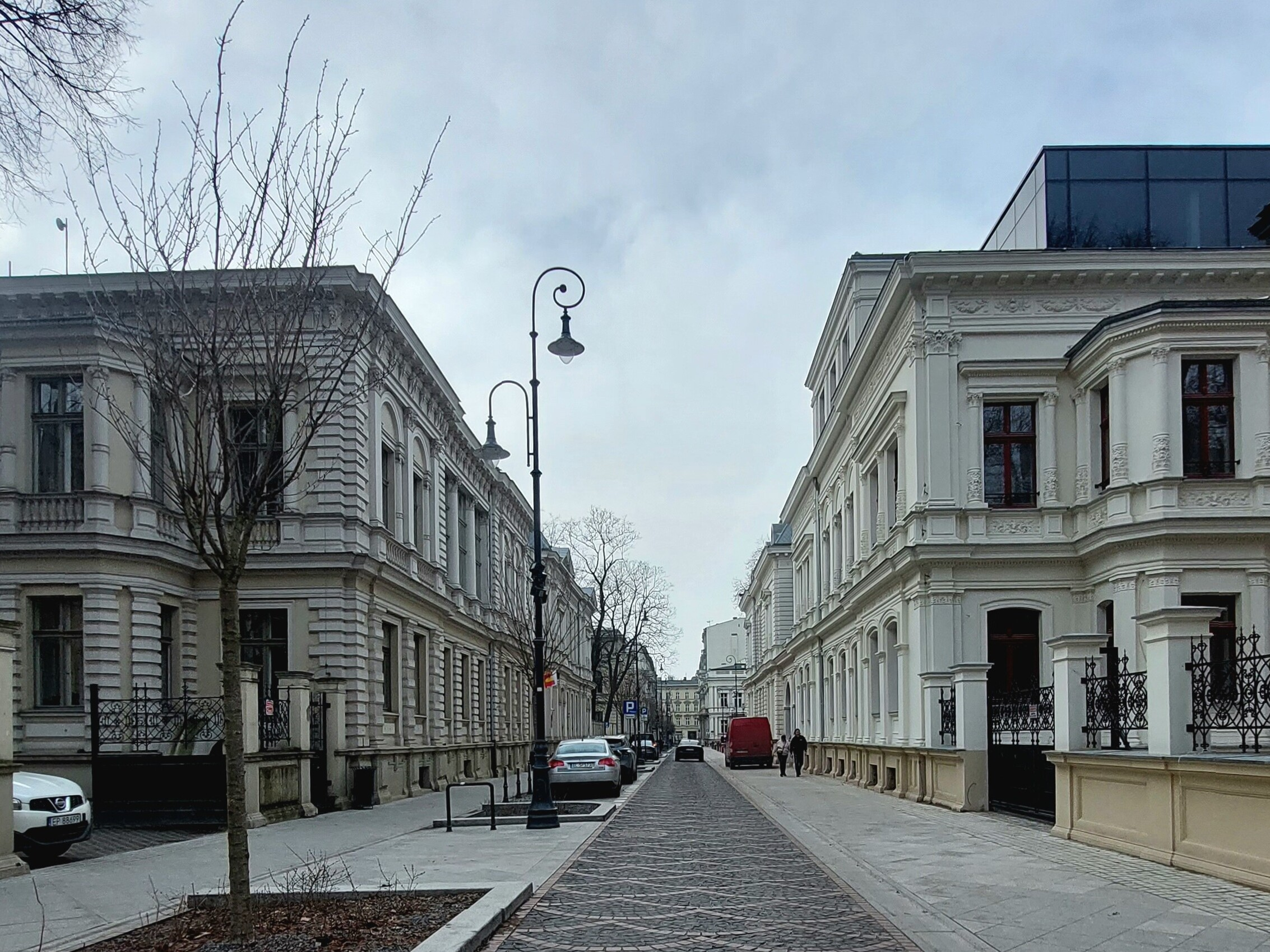
Moniuszki Street

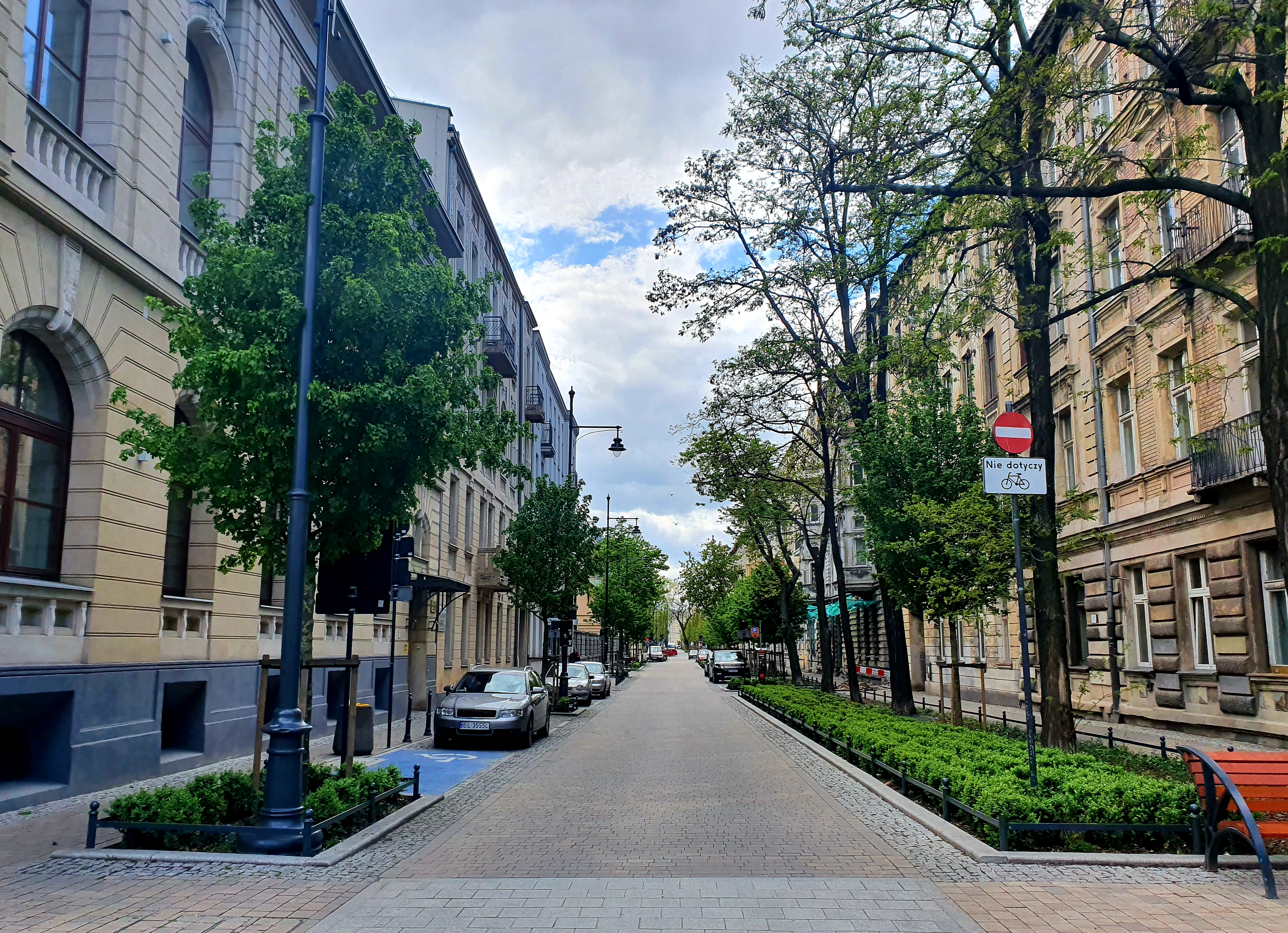
1 Maja Avenue

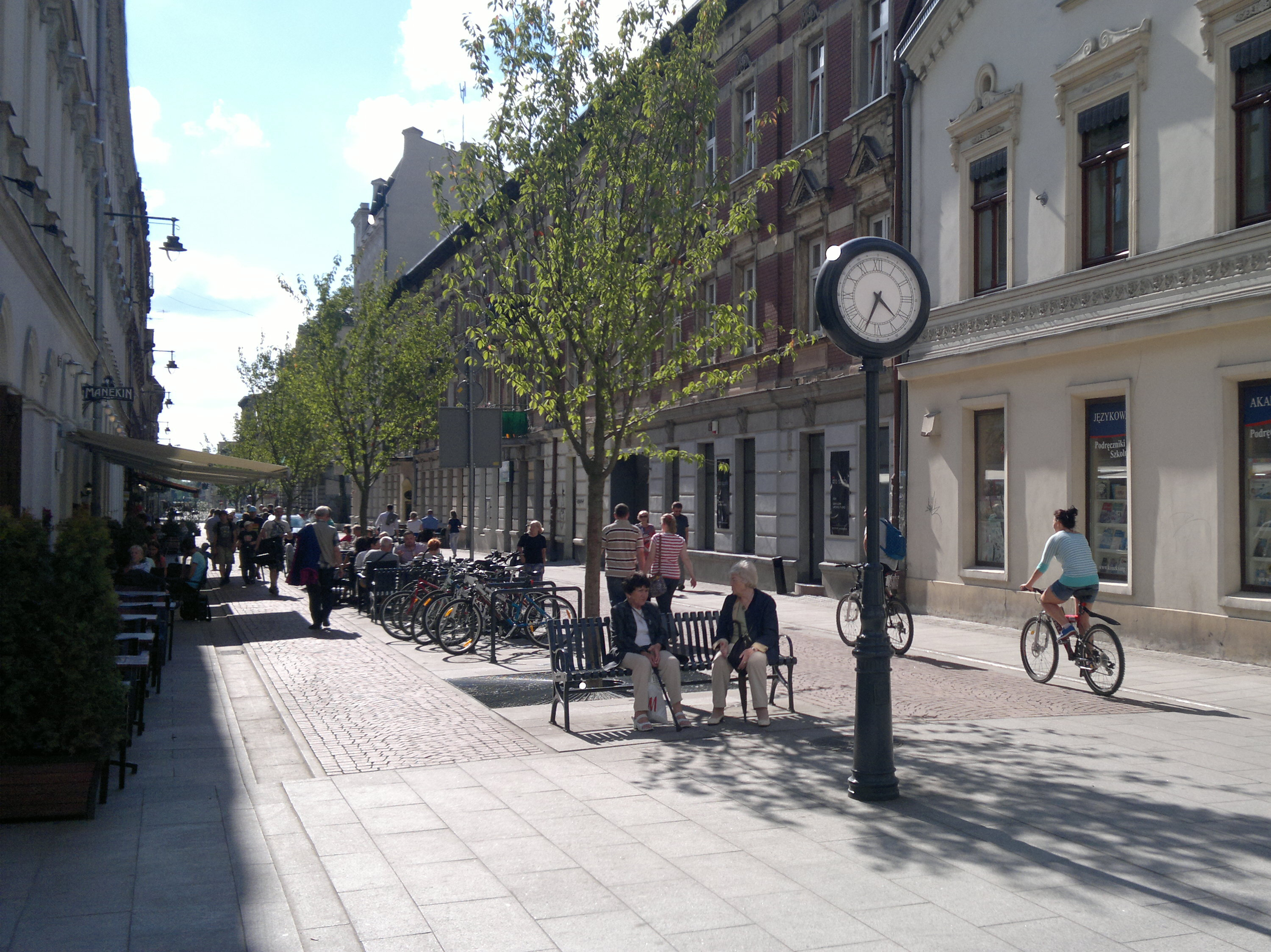
6 Sierpnia Street

In the second decade of the 21st century, a programme for the revitalization of streets and restrictions on car traffic in the city centre of Łódź was implemented. Since 2014, several dozen woonerfs (streets prioritizing pedestrians and cyclists) have been created in the city.

After 1989 the textile industry in Łódź collapsed and the city suffered from social and economic decline. The city's industrial heritage and examples of Polish Art Nouveau became an early tourist attraction. In the 2000s the city's main street, the Piotrkowska Street, was revitalized, providing space for shops and restaurants. By 2011 the city hosted around 60 festivals per year.

The local government's efforts to transform the former industrial city into a thriving urban environment and tourist destination formed the basis for the city's failed bid to organise the 2022 International EXPO exhibition on the subject of urban renewal.

== Geography ==
Łódź covers an area of approximately 293 square kilometres (113 sq mi) and is located in the centre of Poland. The city lies in the lowlands of the Central European Plain, not exceeding 300 metres in elevation. Topographically, the Łódź region is generally characterised by a flat landscape, with only several highlands which do not exceed 50 metres above the terrain level. The soil is predominantly sandy (62%) followed by clay (24%), silt (8%), and organogenic formations (6%) from regional wetlands. The forest cover (equivalent to 4.2% of the whole country) is considerably low compared to other cities, regions, and provinces of Poland.

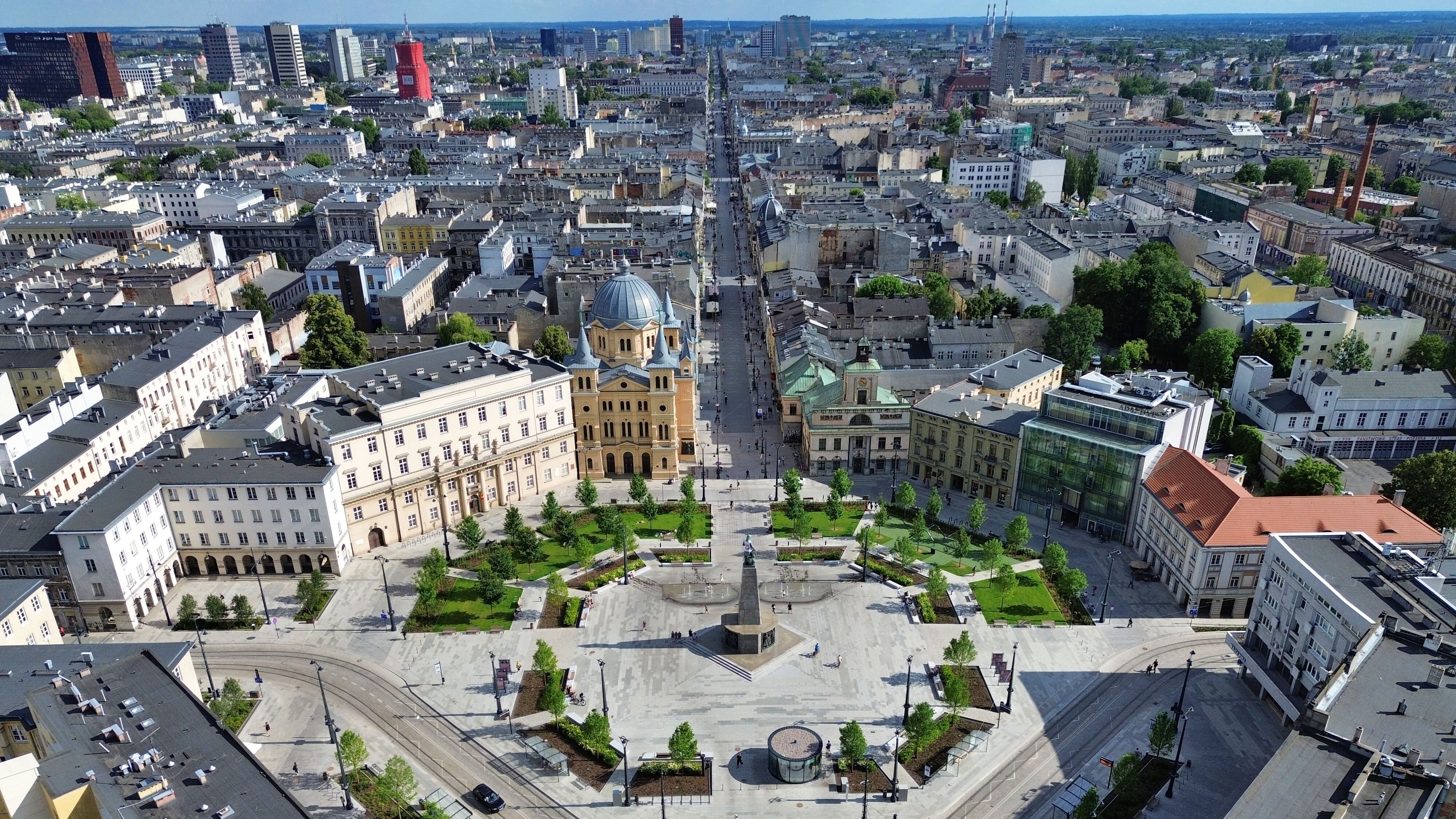
Panorama of the Łódź city centre

=== Climate ===
Łódź has a humid continental climate (Dfb in the Köppen climate classification). The lowest temperature was recorded in January 1987.

Climate data for Łódź, elevation: 68 m (223 ft), 1991–2020 normals, extremes 1951–present
Month	Jan	Feb	Mar	Apr	May	Jun	Jul	Aug	Sep	Oct	Nov	Dec	Year
Record high °C (°F)	12.8 (55.0)	17.5 (63.5)	23.8 (74.8)	29.9 (85.8)	32.7 (90.9)	36.3 (97.3)	37.3 (99.1)	37.6 (99.7)	34.7 (94.5)	25.9 (78.6)	19.2 (66.6)	14.9 (58.8)	37.6 (99.7)
Mean daily maximum °C (°F)	1.2 (34.2)	2.9 (37.2)	7.4 (45.3)	14.4 (57.9)	19.4 (66.9)	22.7 (72.9)	24.9 (76.8)	24.6 (76.3)	19.1 (66.4)	13.0 (55.4)	6.8 (44.2)	2.4 (36.3)	13.2 (55.8)
Daily mean °C (°F)	−1.5 (29.3)	−0.3 (31.5)	3.1 (37.6)	9.0 (48.2)	13.8 (56.8)	17.1 (62.8)	19.2 (66.6)	18.7 (65.7)	13.7 (56.7)	8.6 (47.5)	3.9 (39.0)	0.0 (32.0)	8.8 (47.8)
Mean daily minimum °C (°F)	−4.0 (24.8)	−3.3 (26.1)	−0.7 (30.7)	3.6 (38.5)	8.2 (46.8)	11.6 (52.9)	13.6 (56.5)	13.3 (55.9)	9.0 (48.2)	5.0 (41.0)	1.3 (34.3)	−2.4 (27.7)	4.6 (40.3)
Record low °C (°F)	−31.1 (−24.0)	−27.4 (−17.3)	−21.9 (−7.4)	−8.0 (17.6)	−3.6 (25.5)	−0.3 (31.5)	4.2 (39.6)	3.3 (37.9)	−1.9 (28.6)	−9.9 (14.2)	−16.8 (1.8)	−24.6 (−12.3)	−31.1 (−24.0)
Average precipitation mm (inches)	35.3 (1.39)	34.1 (1.34)	37.6 (1.48)	35.2 (1.39)	60.9 (2.40)	62.3 (2.45)	81.1 (3.19)	54.1 (2.13)	53.4 (2.10)	44.0 (1.73)	39.4 (1.55)	40.7 (1.60)	578.1 (22.76)
Average extreme snow depth cm (inches)	6.8 (2.7)	6.6 (2.6)	4.7 (1.9)	1.6 (0.6)	0.0 (0.0)	0.0 (0.0)	0.0 (0.0)	0.0 (0.0)	0.0 (0.0)	0.2 (0.1)	2.2 (0.9)	3.6 (1.4)	6.8 (2.7)
Average precipitation days (≥ 0.1 mm)	17.27	14.60	14.17	11.17	13.33	13.43	13.77	11.80	11.73	13.03	14.30	16.37	164.97
Average snowy days (≥ 0 cm)	15.3	13.3	6.2	0.9	0.0	0.0	0.0	0.0	0.0	0.2	3.4	8.6	47.9
Average relative humidity (%)	87.6	84.2	77.5	68.6	70.0	70.5	71.3	71.4	78.9	84.1	89.2	89.4	78.6
Mean monthly sunshine hours	48.2	65.8	122.7	187.0	241.8	244.6	250.9	243.4	160.1	111.1	51.2	40.4	1,767.3
Average ultraviolet index	1	1	2	4	6	6	6	6	4	2	1	0	3
Source 1: Institute of Meteorology and Water Management
Source 2: Meteomodel.pl (records, relative humidity 1991–2020), WeatherAtlas (UV)

== Administration ==
=== Government ===
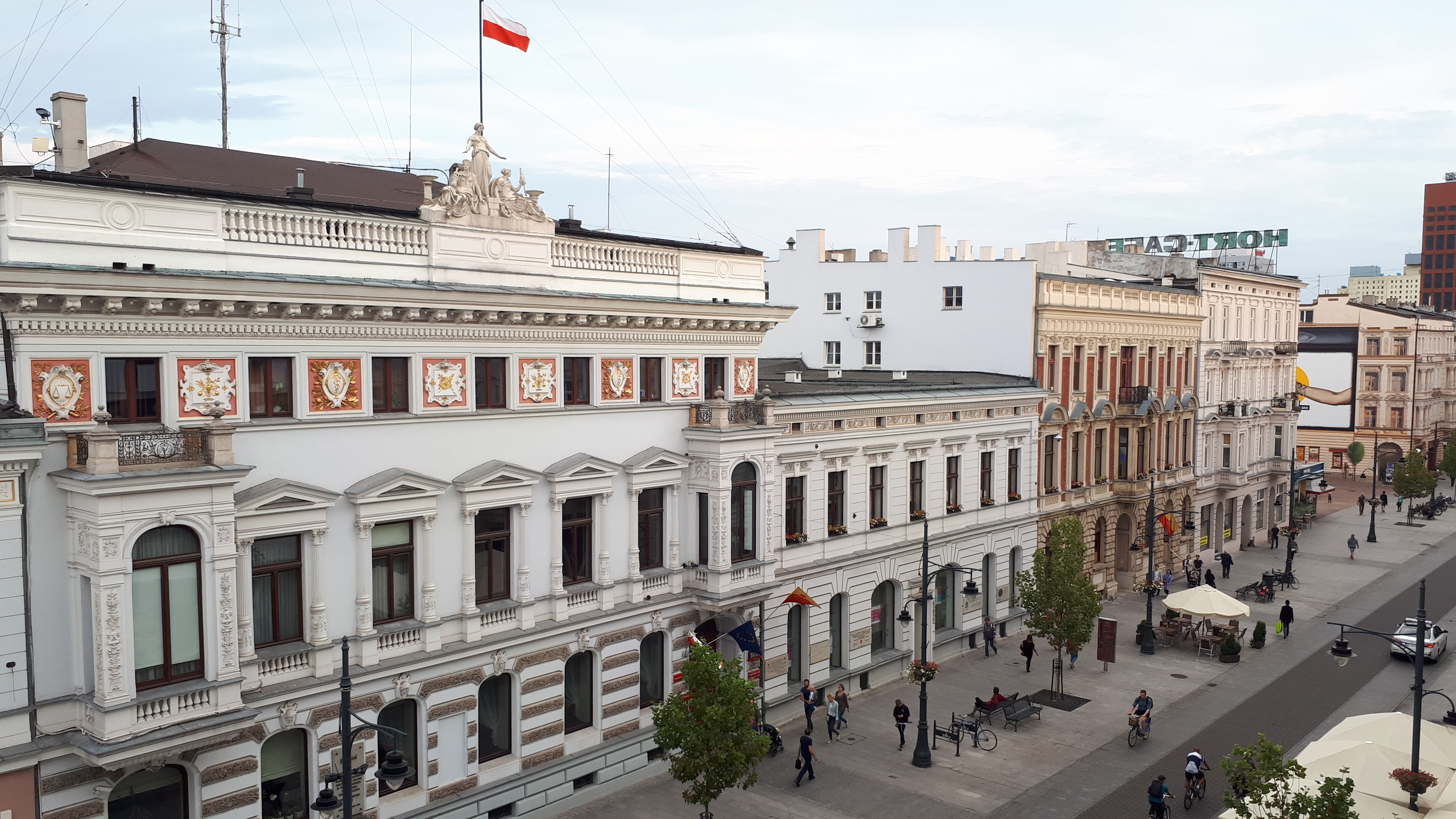
Juliusz Heinzl Palace (left) serves as the seat of city authorities and the local council.

The city's governance is executed by Urząd Miasta Łodzi, a local council or town hall, currently based at Juliusz Heinzl Palace. The power is divided between the President of Łódź (Prezydent Łodzi), a title held by the mayor, and the Rada Miejska assembly comprising 37 elected deputies. The term in office for deputies is 5 years. Łódź also acts as a city with powiat rights, exercising the powers and duties of a local powiat county.

Łódź is the capital of Łódź Voivodeship, one of Poland's 16 provinces, and hosts the voivodeship sejmik – a regional assembly. The city is also the seat of the voivode, the province's governor who is the representative of the Polish Council of Ministers in the voivodeship, is the head of the combined government administration, acts as supervisory authority over local government units and as a higher-level authority within the meaning of the provisions on administrative proceedings.

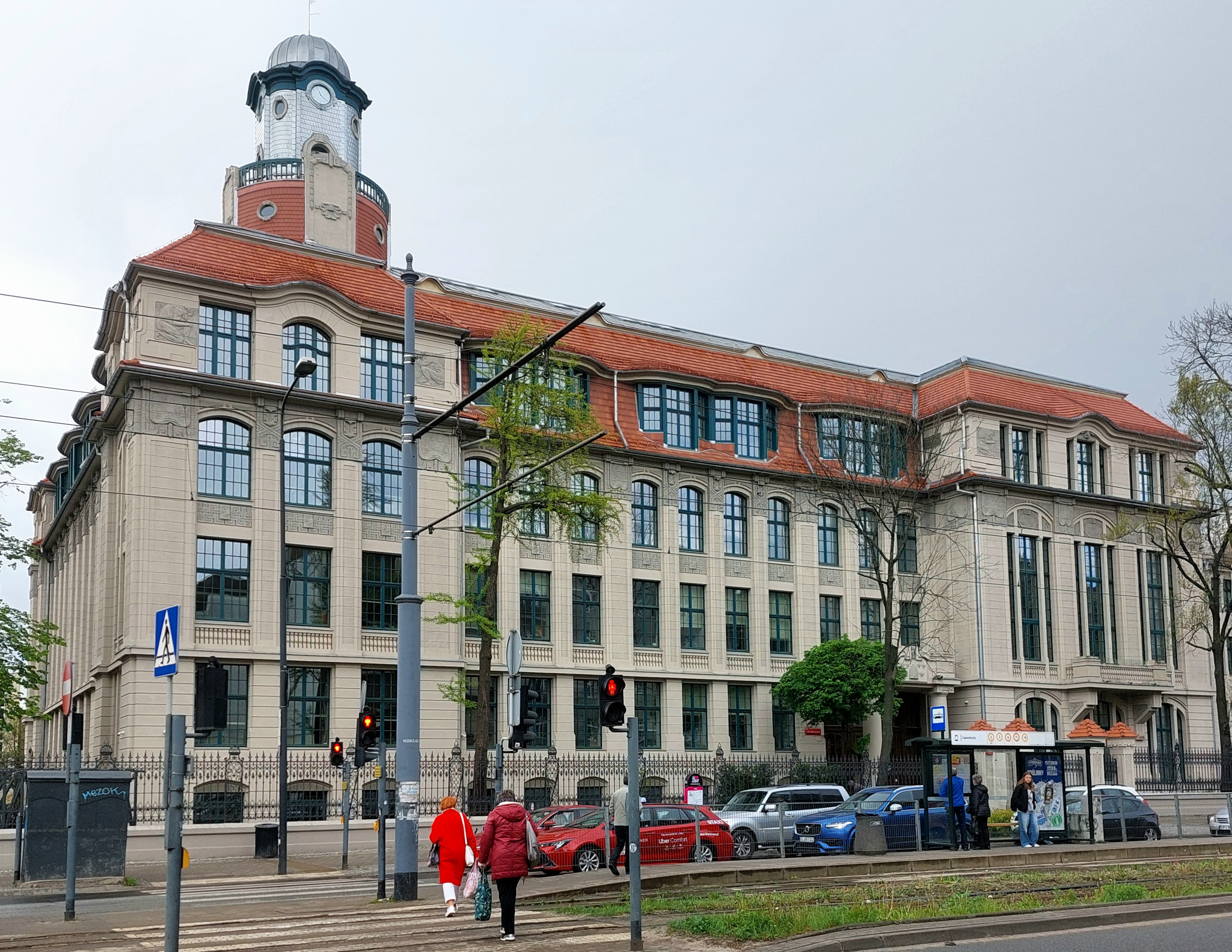
Court of Appeal in Łódź covering the jurisdiction of the district courts in Kalisz, Łódź, Piotrków Trybunalski, Płock and Sieradz

In mediaeval times, the town was governed by the burgomaster, who began his term as early as 1470. The first individual who held the title of "president" was Karol Tangermann, a close aide of Rajmund Rembieliński, when it was still a part of Congress Poland. The first president of Łódź under the independent Second Polish Republic was Leopold Skulski (1917–1919), who subsequently became the prime minister of Poland. The incumbent president since 2010 is Hanna Zdanowska from the Civic Coalition party.

=== Administrative division ===
Łódź was previously divided into 5 major boroughs (dzielnica) – Bałuty, Górna, Polesie, Śródmieście, and Widzew. In January 1993, the system of boroughs was abolished and the city became a single entity with no real subdivisions. In April 2000, a system of 36 (Note: List of the 36 units or neighbourhoods: Bałuty-Centrum, Bałuty-Doły, Bałuty Zachodnie, Julianów-Marysin-Rogi, Łagiewniki, Radogoszcz, Teofilów-Wielkopolska, Osiedle Wzniesień Łódzkich, Chojny, Chojny-Dąbrowa, Górniak, Nad Nerem, Piastów-Kurak, Rokicie, Ruda, Wiskitno, Osiedle im. Józefa Montwiłła-Mireckiego, Karolew-Retkinia Wschód, Koziny, Lublinek-Pienista, Retkinia Zachód-Smulsko, Stare Polesie, Zdrowie-Mania, Złotno, Śródmieście-Wschód, Osiedle Katedralna, Andrzejów, Dolina Łódki, Mileszki, Nowosolna, Olechów-Janów, Stary Widzew, Stoki, Widzew-Wschód, Zarzew, and Osiedle nr 33.) neighbourhoods or dependent units (osiedle) was imposed by the City Council for administrative purposes only; these units have no local governing or regulatory authority.

== Demographics ==
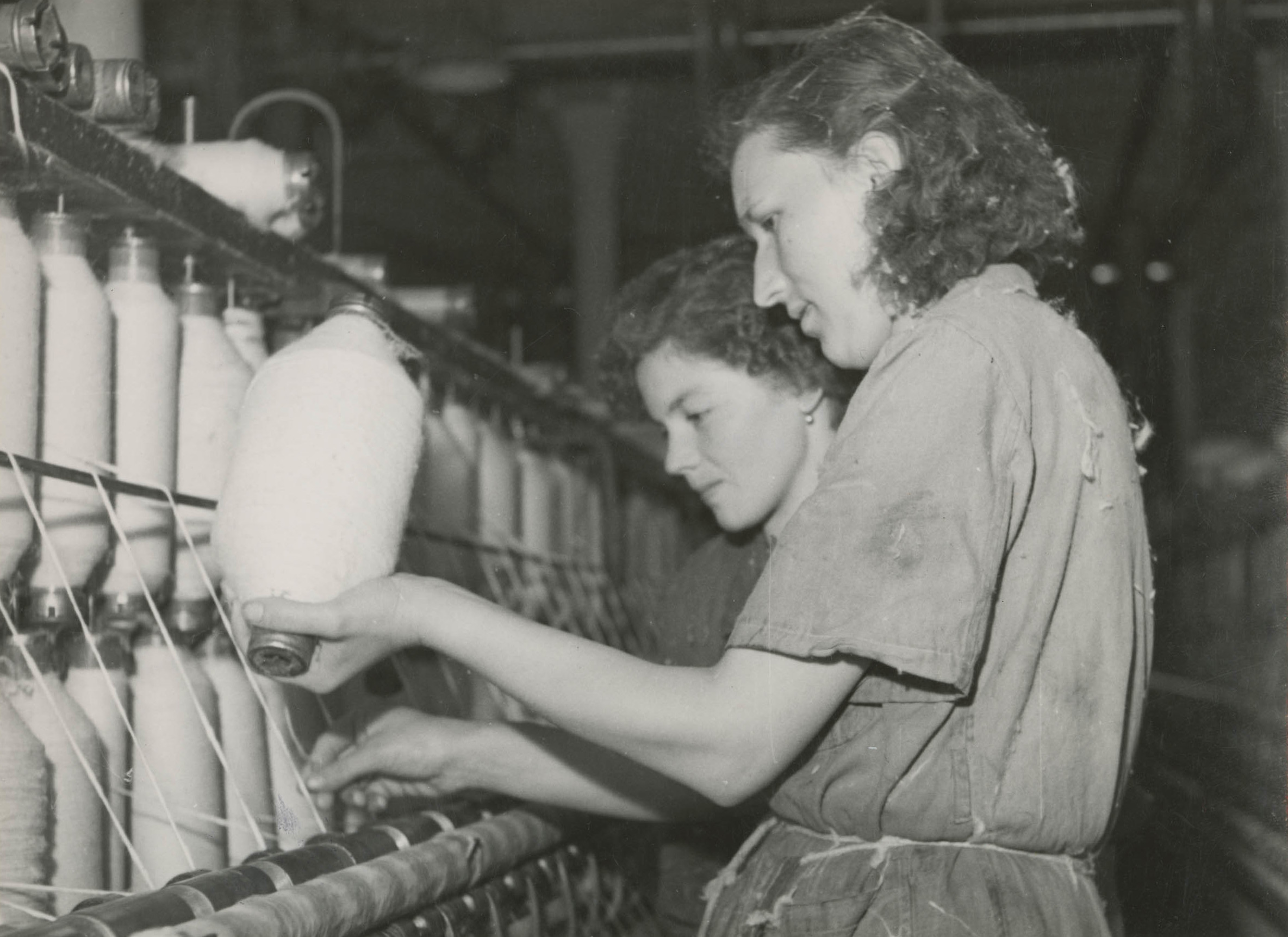
Female employees at a textile factory in Łódź, 1950s

According to Statistics Poland (GUS), Łódź was inhabited by 672,185 people and had a population density of 2,292 persons per square kilometre (5,940/sq mi), as of December 2020. Approximately 55.7 per cent of inhabitants are of working age (18–64 years), which is a considerable decrease from 64.1 per cent in 2010. An estimated 29.1 per cent is of post-working age compared to 21.8 per cent ten years earlier. In 2020, 54.39 per cent (365,500) of all residents were women. Łódź has one of the highest feminisation rates among Poland's major cities, a legacy of the city's industrial past, when the textile factories attracted large numbers of female employees.

Historical population
Year	Pop.	±%
1950	620,183	—
1960	709,698	+14.4%
1970	762,454	+7.4%
1978	823,326	+8.0%
1988	854,261	+3.8%
2002	789,318	−7.6%
2011	728,892	−7.7%
2021	670,642	−8.0%

At its peak in 1988 the population was around 854,000; however, this has since declined due to low fertility rates, outward migration and a lower life expectancy than in other parts of Poland. Łódź was the country's second largest city until 2007, when it lost its position to Kraków. A major contributing factor was the abrupt transition from socialist to market-based economy after 1989 and the resulting economic crisis, but the economic growth which followed has not reversed the trend. Depopulation and ageing are major impediments for the future development of the city, putting strain on social infrastructure and medical services. As a result of the continuing demographic crisis and rapid population loss, Łódź was overtaken by Wrocław and dropped to become the country's fourth-largest city in 2022.

Historically, Łódź was multi-ethnic and its diverse population comprised migrants from other regions of Europe. In 1839, approximately 78 per cent (6,648) of the total population was German. In 1913, Łódź had a population of 506,100 people, of whom 251,700 (49.7%) were Poles, 171,900 (34%) were Jews, 75,000 (14.8%) were Germans, and 6,300 (1.3%) were Russians. According to the 1931 Polish census, the total population of 604,000 included 375,000 (59%) Poles, 192,000 (32%) Jews and 54,000 (9%) Germans. By 1939, the Jewish minority had grown to well over 200,000.

=== Religion ===
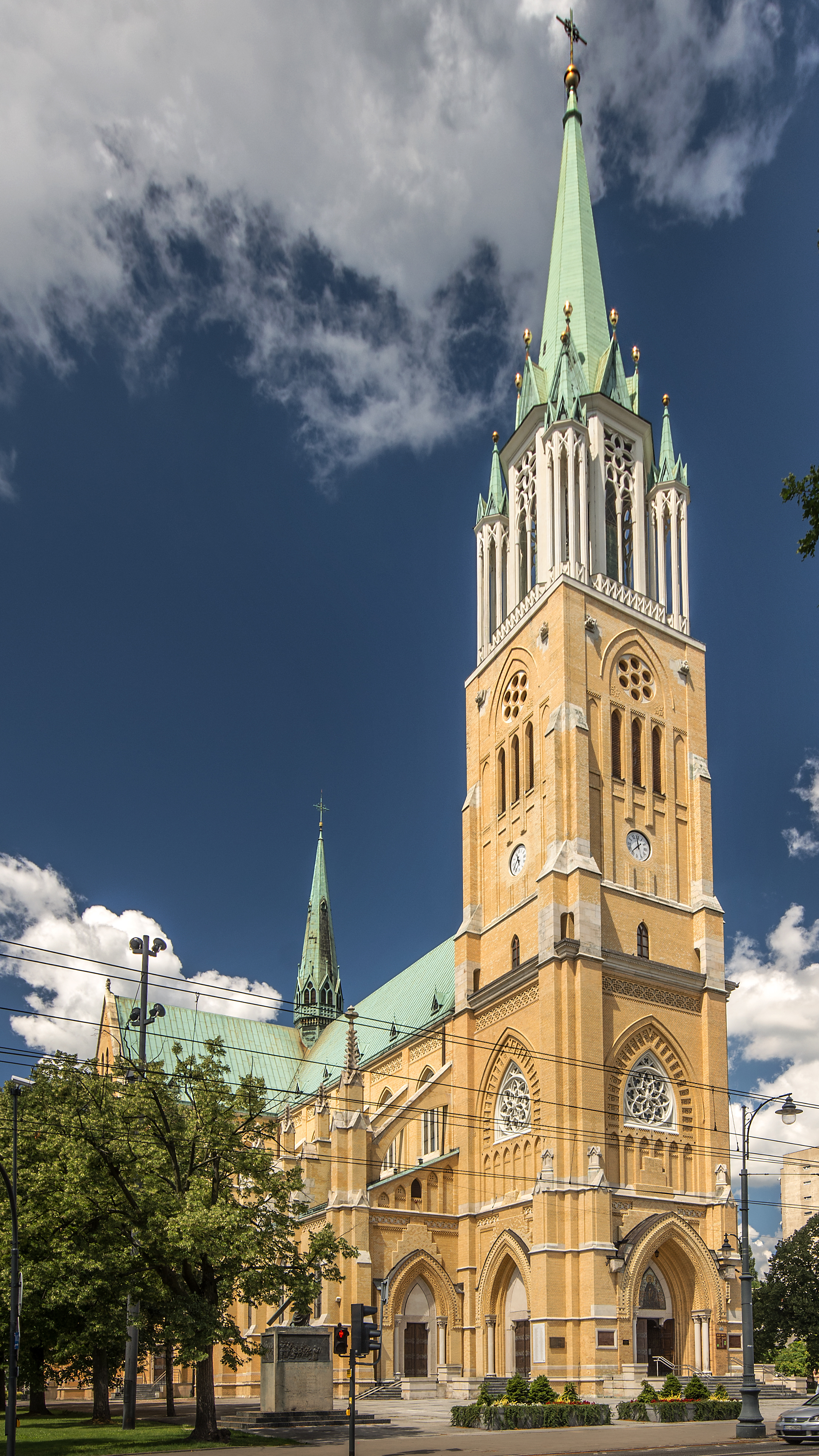
Catholic Archcathedral Basilica of St. Stanislaus Kostka

The majority of believers in Łódź adhere to Roman Catholicism, the largest religious denomination in Poland. The first Catholic bishopric was established in December 1920 and has been elevated to the Roman Catholic Archdiocese of Łódź in 1992 by Pope John Paul II. The primary church for Catholic worship is the Basilica of St. Stanislaus Kostka, which is often reserved for special occasions or during religious holidays. Constructed in 1912 in the Gothic Revival style, it is the tallest building in the city and one of Poland's tallest churches since the completion of the tower in 1927. The Feast of Corpus Christi is widely celebrated and annual marches take place on Piotrkowska Street, in front of the cathedral. Despite this, church attendance in Łódź is one of the lowest in Poland; mass attendance was estimated at 26% in 2013 and fell to 17% by 2023. Statistics also show that the city and its environs have one of the highest concentration of atheists in Poland.

Historically, Łódź had a strong and influential Protestant population (11% in 1921, 9.2% in 1931) that had its origins with the migration of German-speaking weavers and textile workers throughout the 19th century. The Evangelical Church of the Augsburg Confession representing Lutherans is the largest of the Protestant denominations. The city falls under the Lutheran Diocese of Warsaw, though the congregation is headquartered at the Church of St. Peter and St. Paul in Pabianice. The only active Lutheran church in Łódź is the historic St. Matthew's Church, which seasonally serves as a concert hall. There is also a parish of the Polish Reformed Church (Calvinist), dating back to 1888, as well as Methodist and Evangelical temples. Łódź is considered to be one of the centres of Jehovah's Witnesses' activity in Poland.

Judaism was once the city's second largest denomination (33.4% in 1931), with up to 250 synagogues and shtiebels in existence prior to 1939 and a strong cultural output. The Stara Synagogue, commonly known as Alte Szil, and Ezras Israel Synagogue were the primary places of worship for Orthodox Jews. The Great Synagogue, the largest of its kind, served the Reformed Jewish community. All were destroyed during the Second World War, except for the defunct 19th-century Synagoga Reicherów. The Union of Jewish Religious Communities in Poland (ZGWŻ) manages the Łódź municipality; the local base is situated at a newer synagogue on Pomorska Street where the Community maintains kosher facilities and a mikveh.

Łódź is the seat of a Mariavite Church diocese, initially created in 1910. The Marivites are followers of Old Catholicism and a considerable minority; there are only three Mariavite dioceses across the country.

Important places of worship

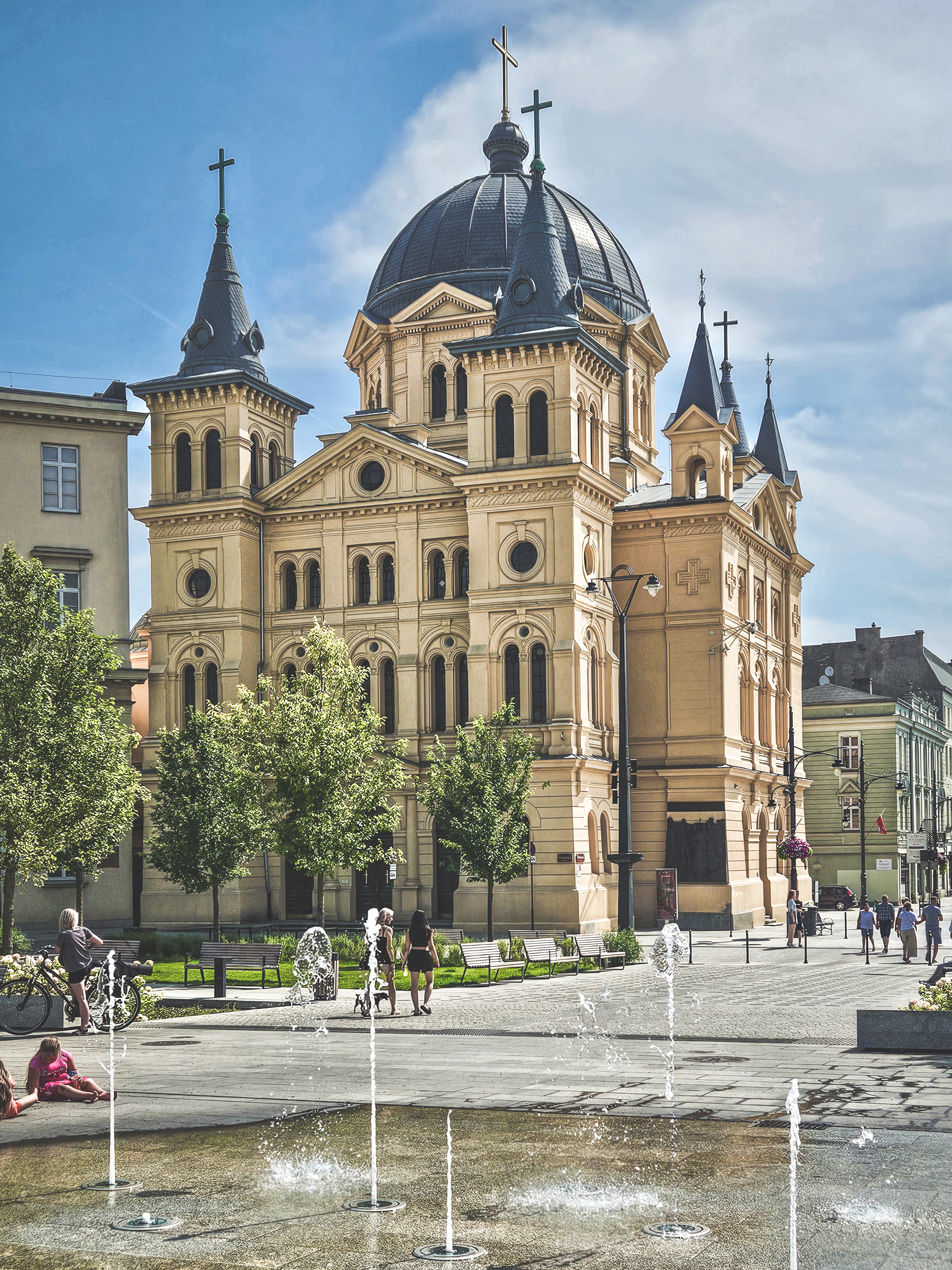
Holy Spirit Church

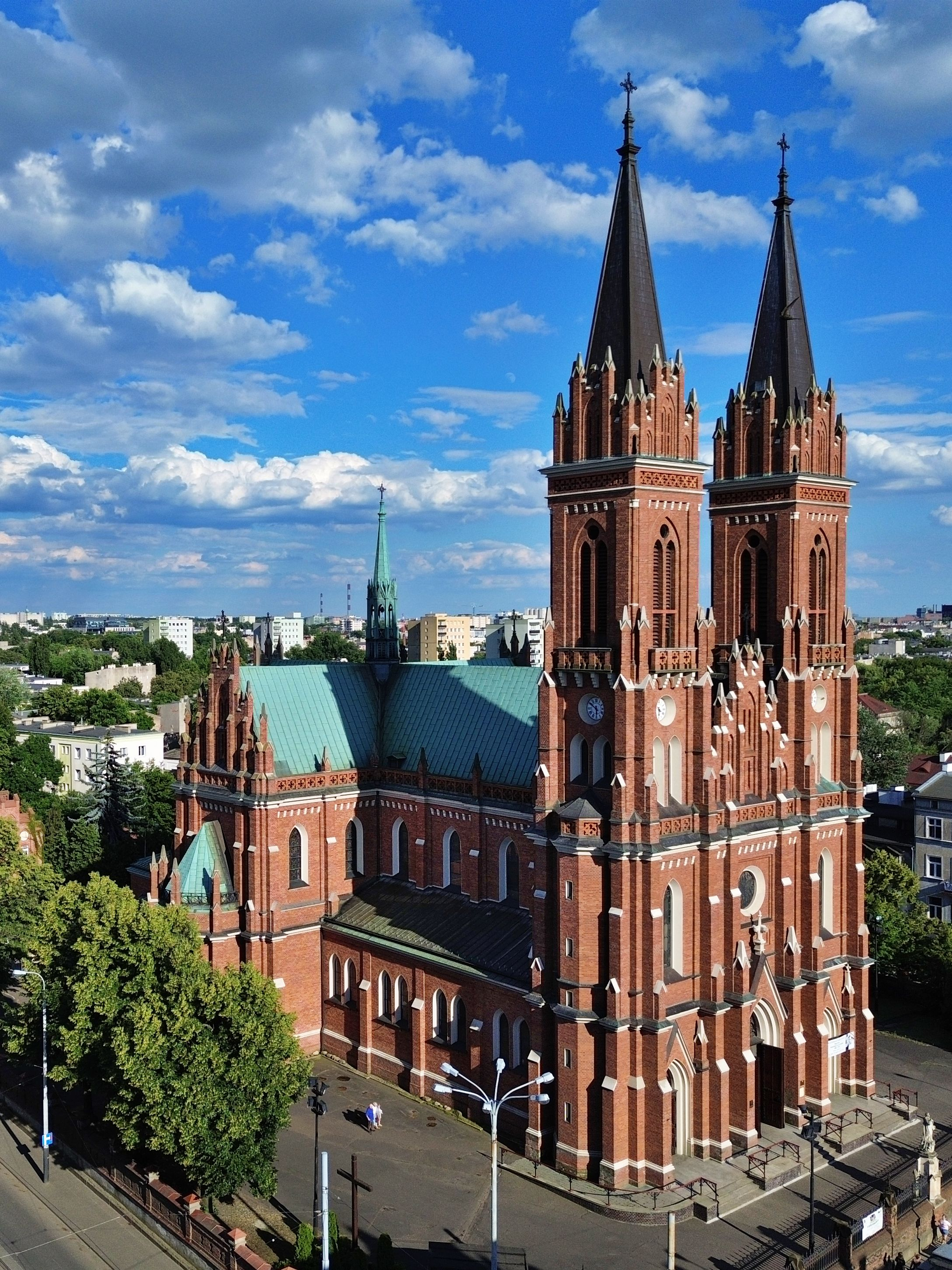
Church of the Assumption of the Blessed Virgin Mary

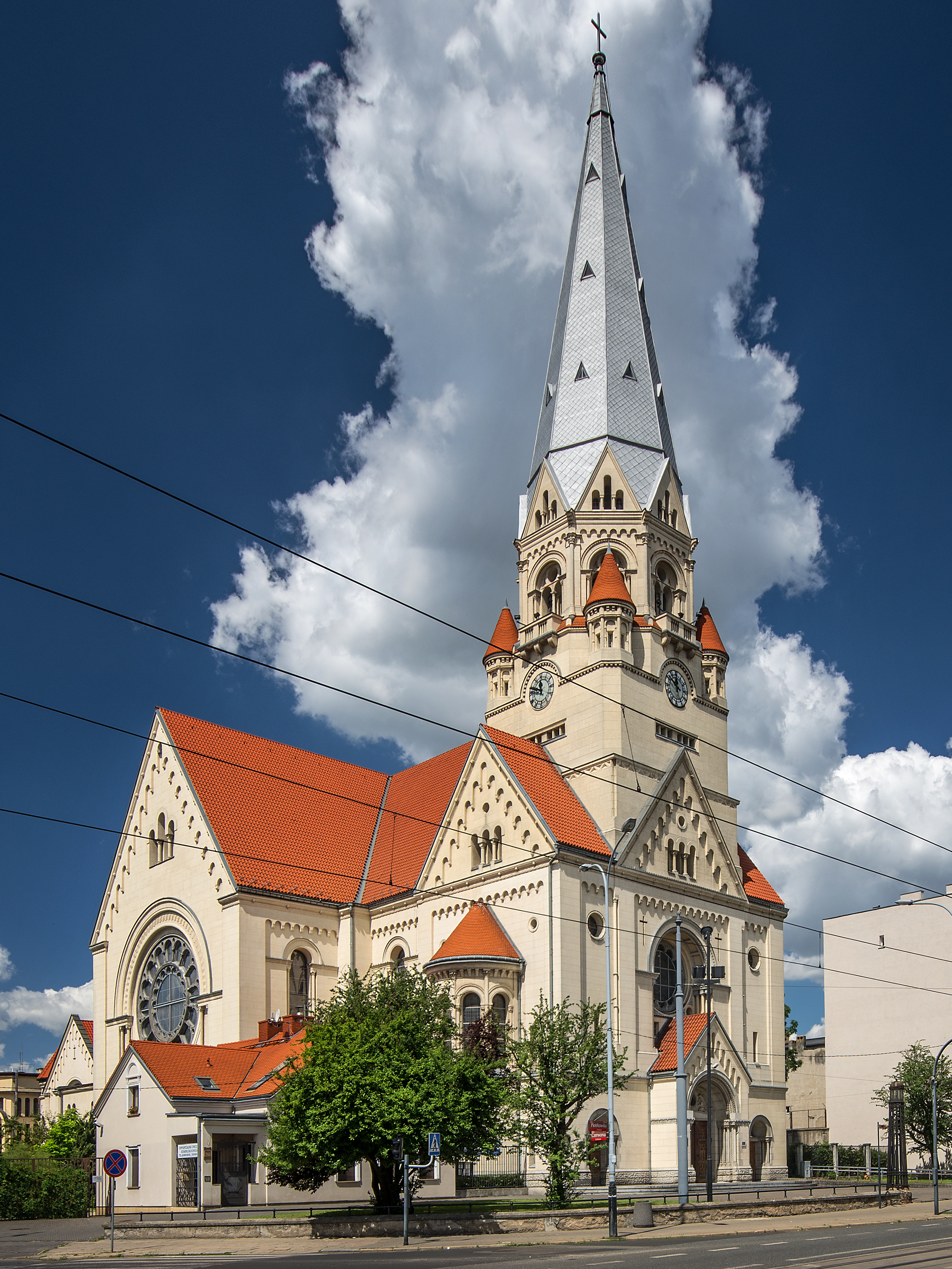
St. Matthew's Church

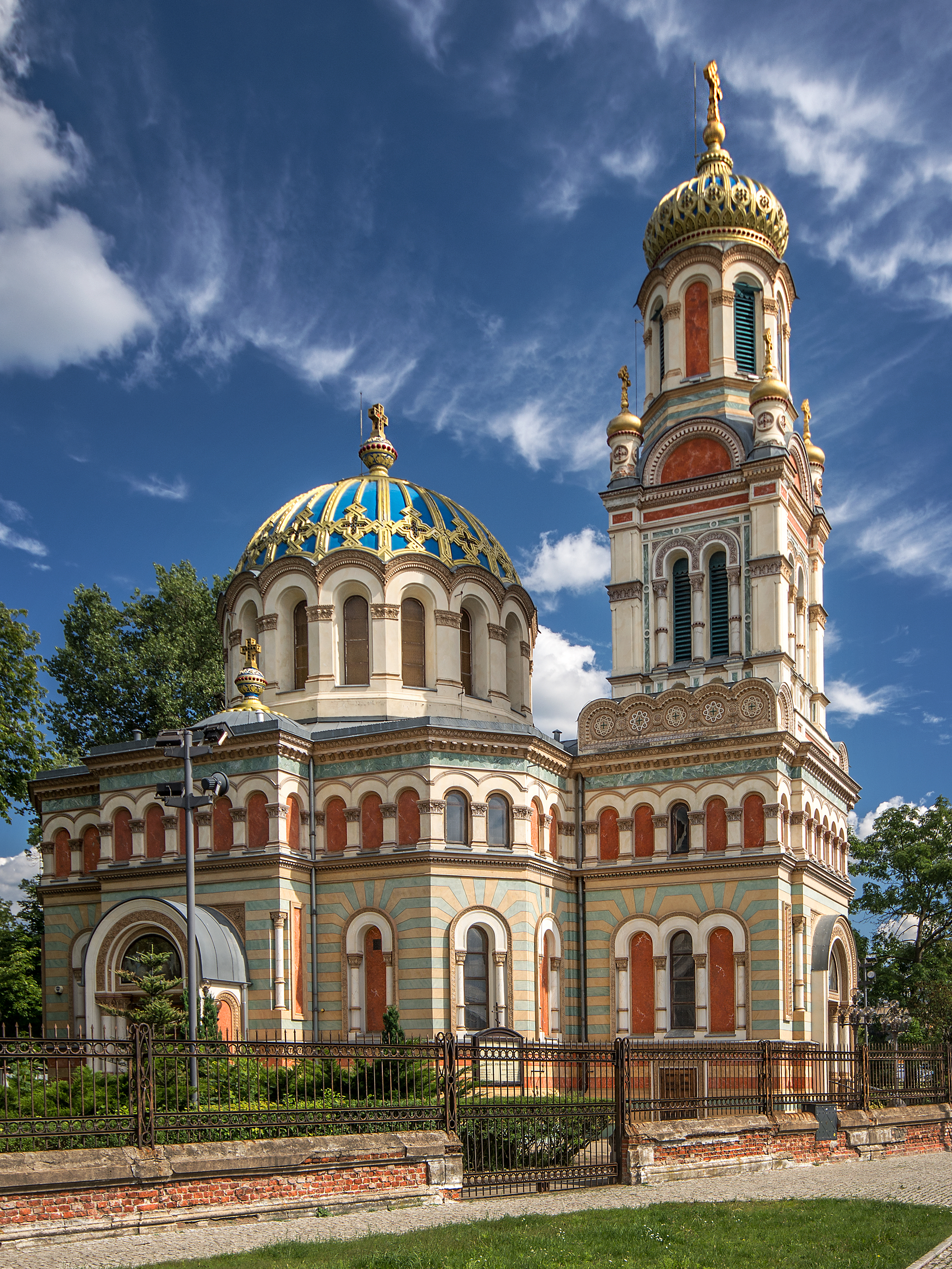
Alexander Nevsky Orthodox Cathedral

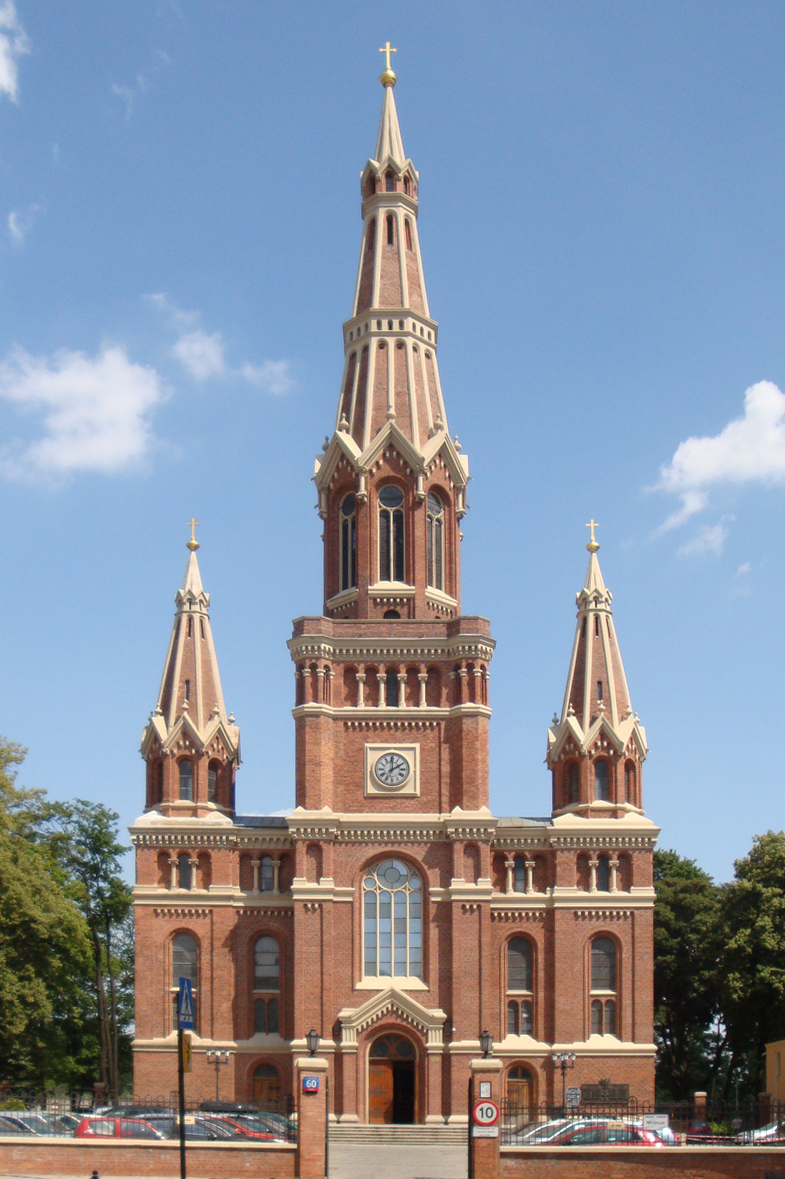
Church of St. John the Evangelist

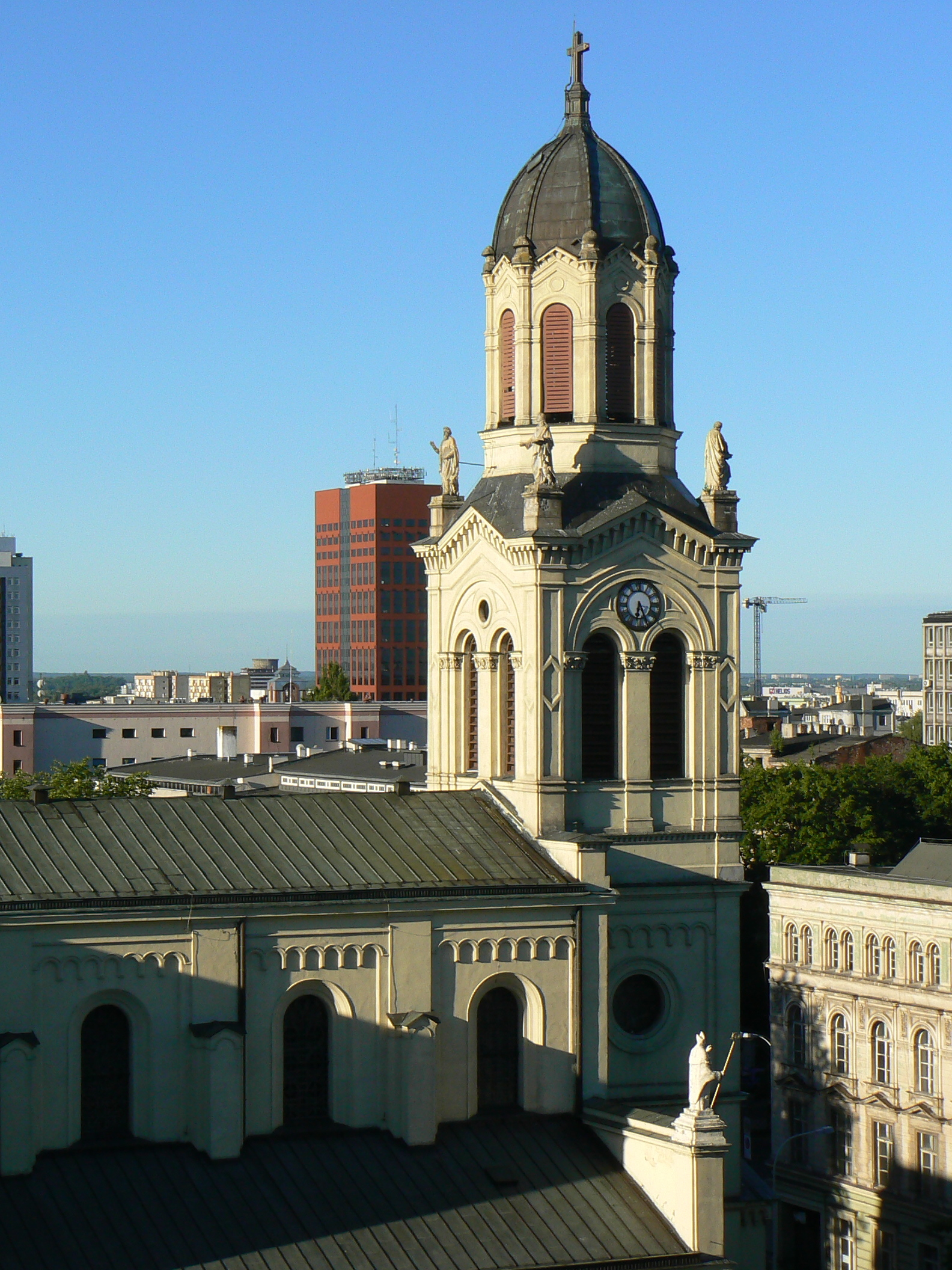
Church of the Exaltation of the Holy Cross

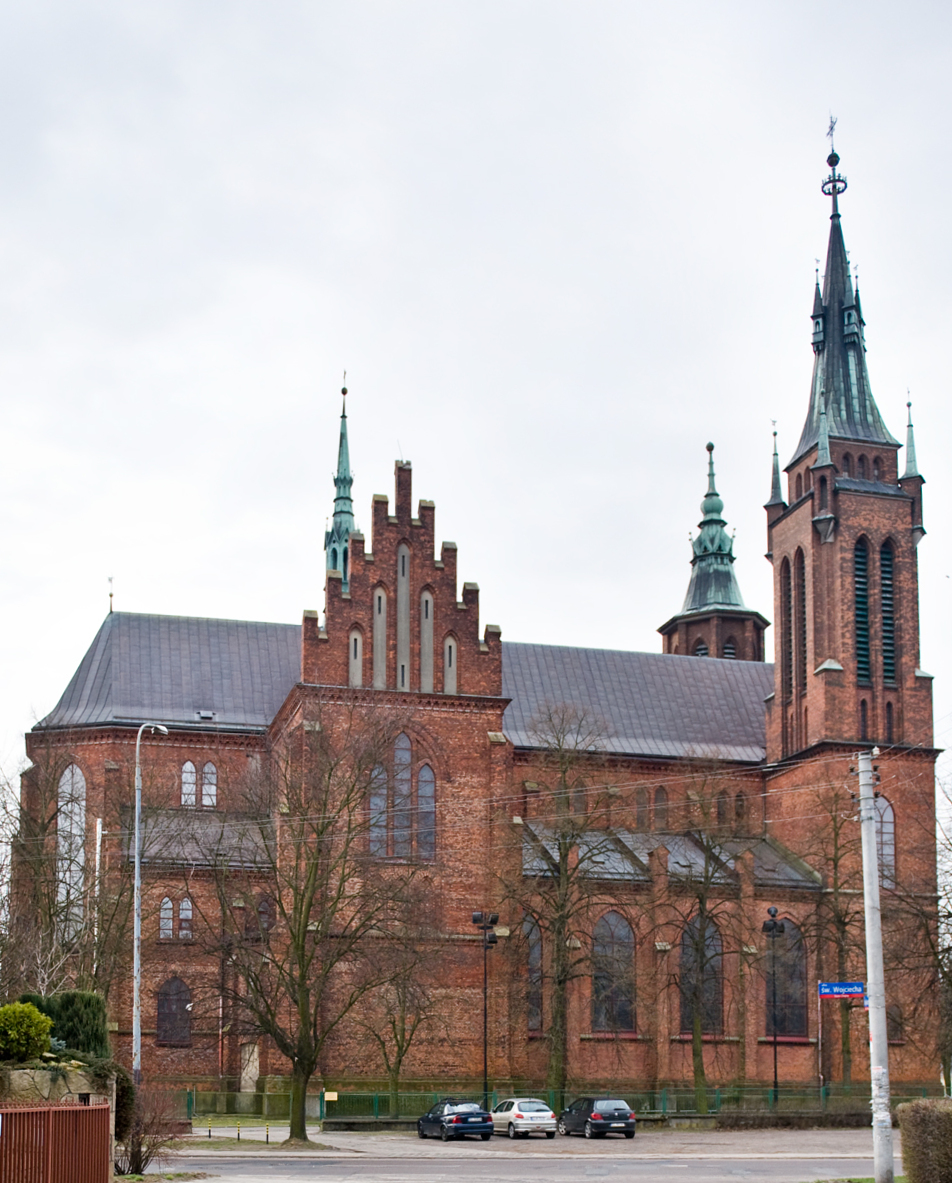
Church of St. Adalbert

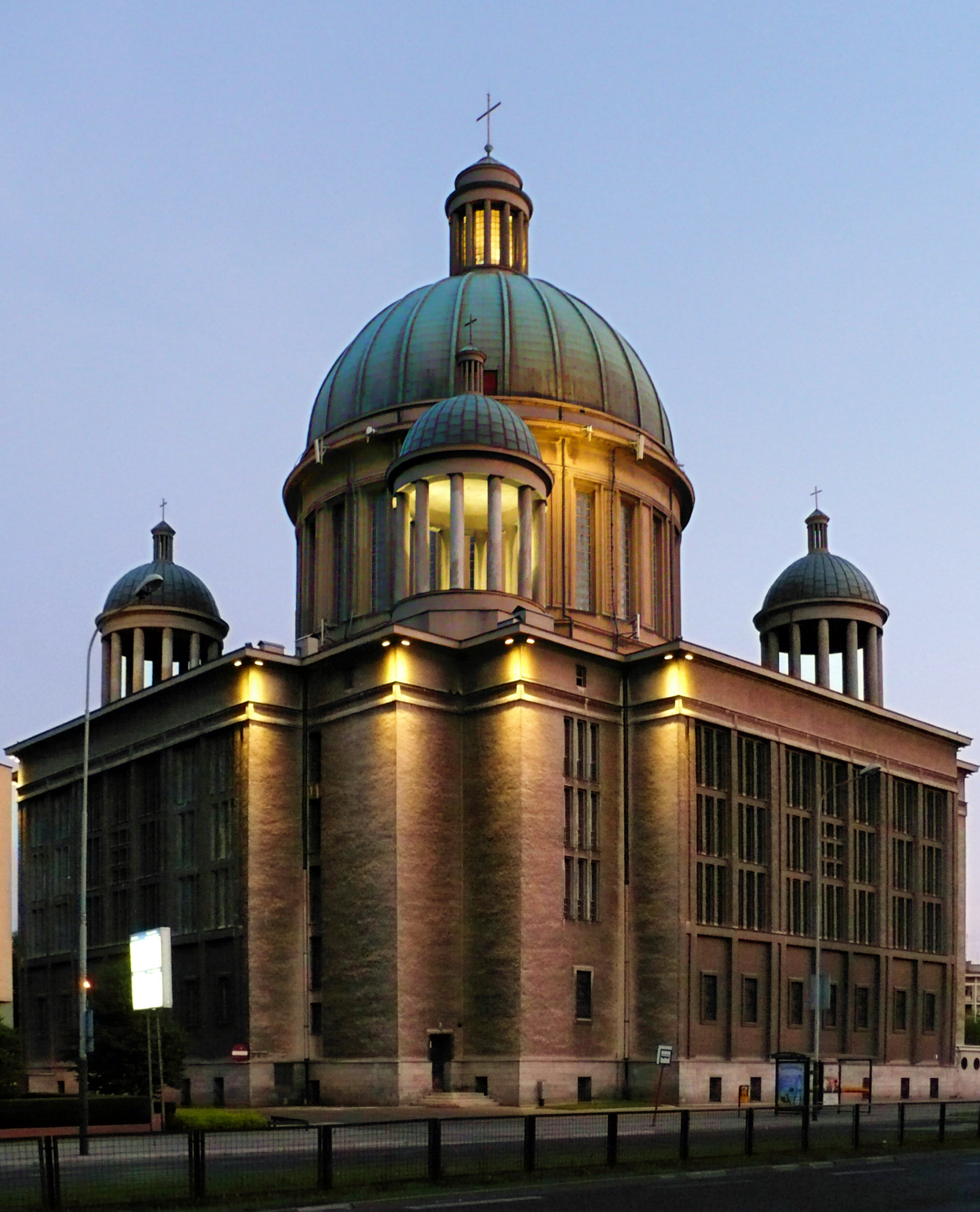
Church of St. Therese

== Economy and infrastructure ==
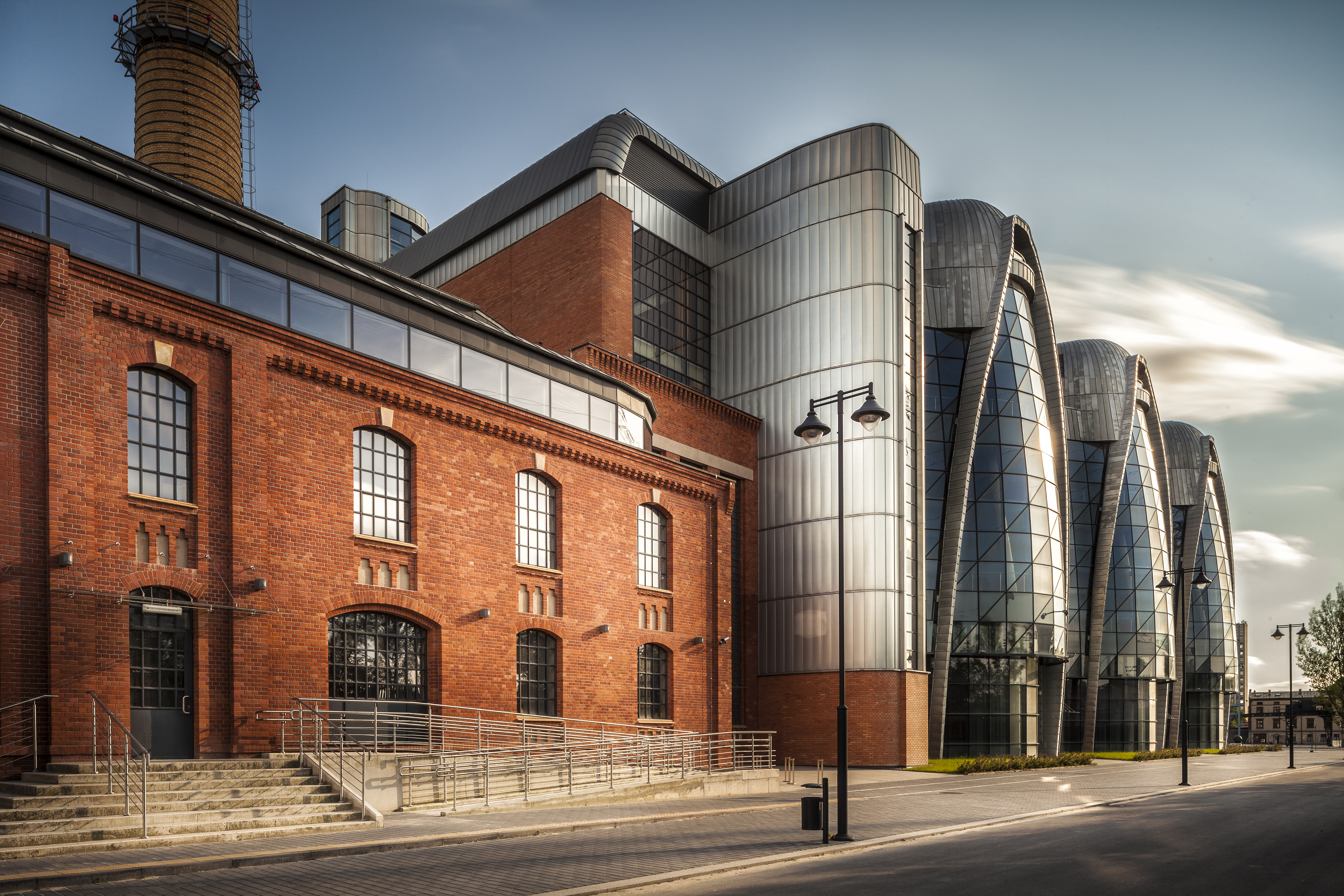
EC1 Science and Technology Centre in a former power plant

Before 1990, the economy of Łódź was heavily reliant on the textile industry, which had developed in the city in the nineteenth century owing to the abundance of rivers used to power the industry's fulling mills, bleaching plants and other machinery. Because of the growth in this industry, the city has sometimes been called the "Polish Manchester" and the "lingerie capital of Poland". As a result, Łódź grew from a population of 13,000 in 1840 to over 500,000 in 1913. By the time right before World War I Łódź had become one of the most densely populated industrial cities in the world, with 13,280 inhabitants per km^{2}, and also one of the most polluted. The textile industry declined dramatically in 1990 and 1991, and no major textile company survives in Łódź. However, countless small companies still provide a significant output of textiles, mostly for export. Łódź is no longer a significant industrial centre, but it has become a major hub for the business services sector in Poland owing to the availability of highly skilled workers and active cooperation between local universities and the business sector.

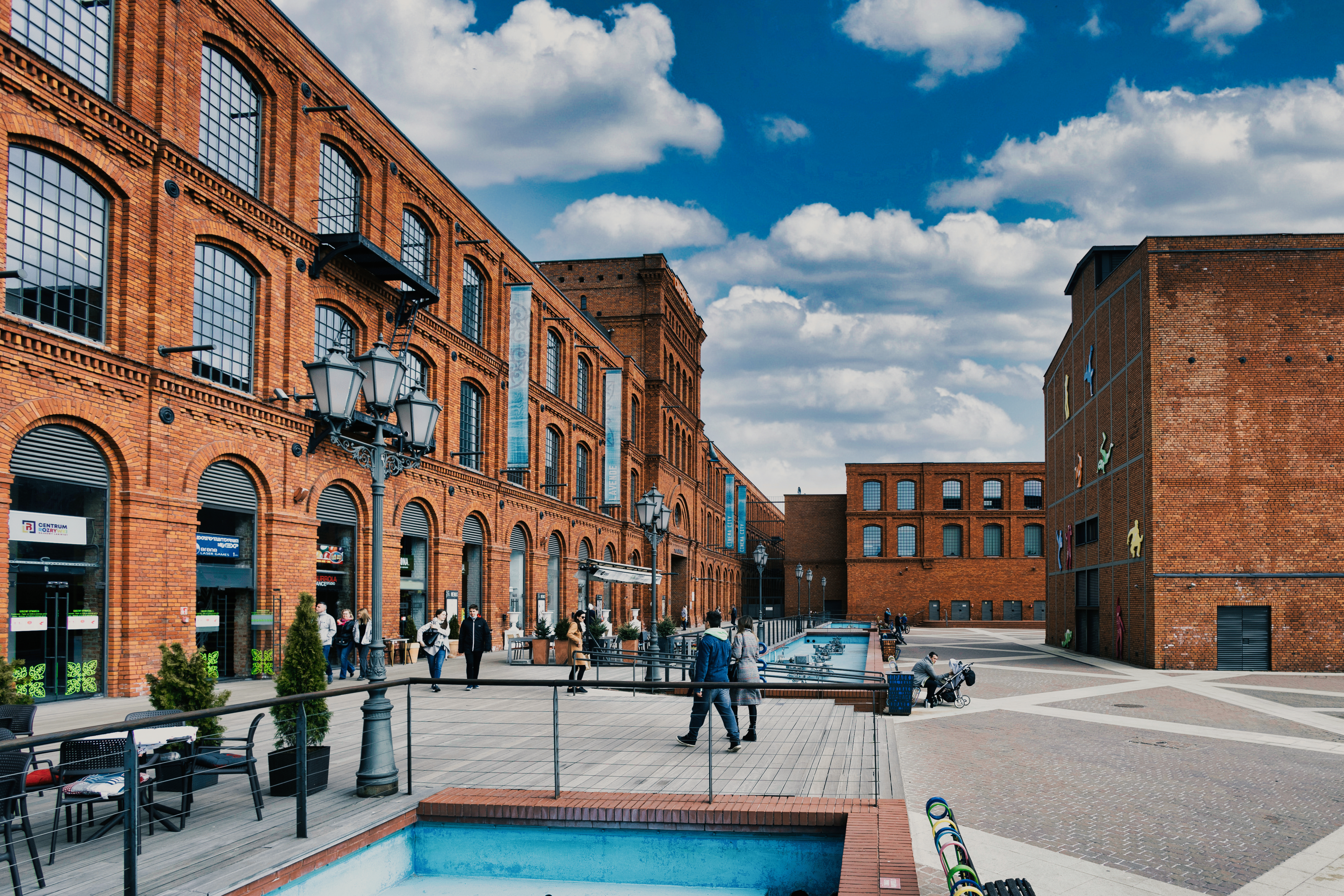
Manufaktura – a textile factory that became a shopping centre

The city benefits from its central location in Poland. A number of firms have located their logistics centres in the vicinity. Two motorways, A1 spanning from the north to the south of Poland, and A2 going from the east to the west, intersect northeast of the city. As of 2012, the A2 is complete to Warsaw and the northern section of A1 is largely completed. With these connections, the advantages of the city's central location should increase even further. Work has also begun on upgrading the railway connection with Warsaw, which reduced the 2-hour travel time to make the 137 km (85 mi) journey 1.5 hours in 2009. As of 2018, travel time from Łódź to Warsaw is around 1.2 hours with the modern Pesa Dart trains.

Recent years have seen many foreign companies opening and establishing their offices in Łódź. The Indian IT company Infosys has one of its centres in the city. In January 2009 Dell announced that it will shift production from its plant in Limerick, Ireland to its plant in Łódź. The city's investor friendly policies have attracted 980 foreign investors by January 2009. Foreign investment was one of the factors which decreased the unemployment rate in Łódź to 6.5 per cent in December 2008, from 20 per cent four years earlier.

=== Transport ===
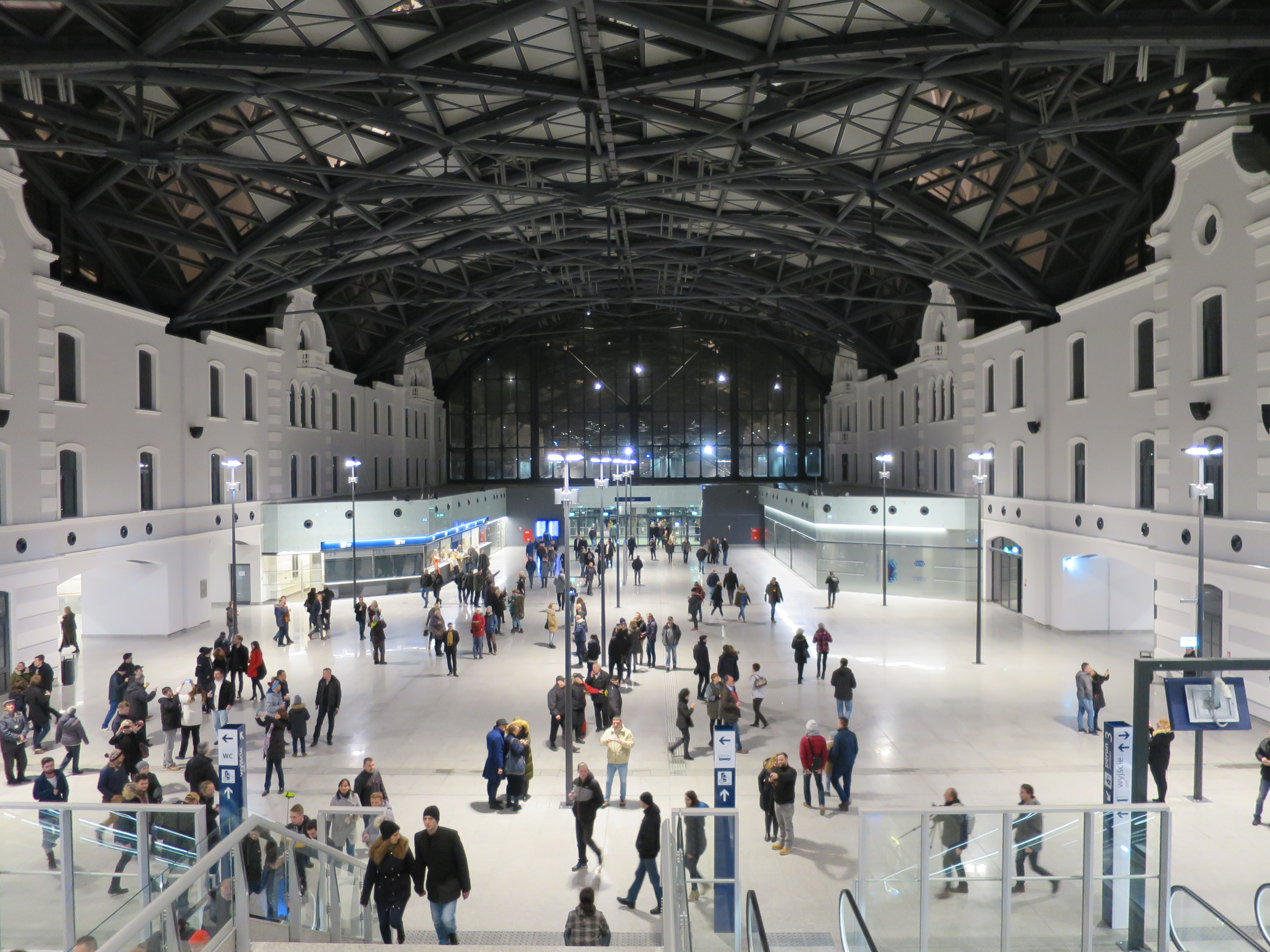
Main hall of the Łódź Fabryczna station

Łódź is situated near the geographical centre of Poland, only a short distance away from the motorway junction in Stryków where the two main north–south (A1) and east–west (A2) Polish transport corridors meet, which positions the city on two of the ten major trans-European routes: from Gdańsk to Žilina and Brno and from Berlin to Moscow via Warsaw. It is also part of the New Silk Road, a regular cargo rail connection with the Chinese city of Chengdu operating since 2013. Łódź is served by the national motorway network, an international airport, and long-distance and regional railways. It is at the centre of a regional and commuter rail network operating from the city's various train stations. Bus and tram services are operated by a municipal public transport company. There are 193 km (120 mi) of bicycle routes throughout the city (as in January 2019).

Major road network in the city (2009)

Major roads include:

- A1: Gdańsk – Toruń – Łódź – Częstochowa – Cieszyn (national border)
- A2: Świecko (national border) – Poznań – Łódź – Warszawa
- S8: Wrocław – Sieradz – Łódź – Piotrków Trybunalski – Warszawa – Białystok
- S14: Pabianice – Konstantynów Łódzki – Aleksandrów Łódzki – Zgierz
- DK14: Łowicz – Głowno – Stryków – Łódź – Zduńska Wola – Sieradz – Złoczew – Walichnowy
- DK72: Konin – Turek – Poddębice – Łódź – Brzeziny – Rawa Mazowiecka
- DK91: Gdańsk – Tczew – Toruń – Łódź – Piotrków Trybunalski – Radomsko – Częstochowa

==== Airport ====
The city has an international airport: Łódź Władysław Reymont Airport located 6 kilometres (4 miles) from the city centre. Flights connect the city with destinations in Europe including Turkey. In 2014 the airport handled 253,772 passengers. It is the 8th largest airport in Poland.

==== Public transport ====
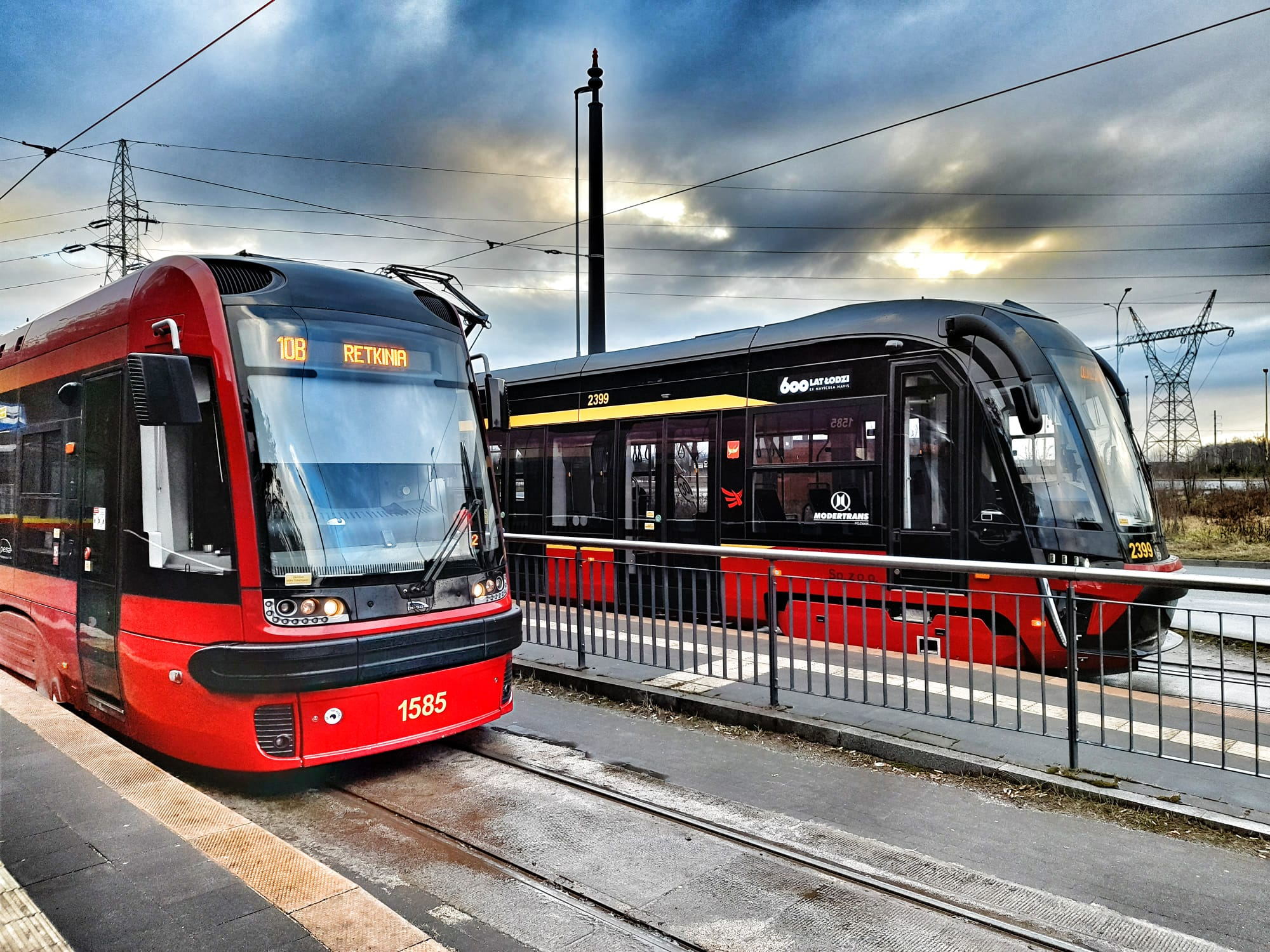
Trams in Łódź

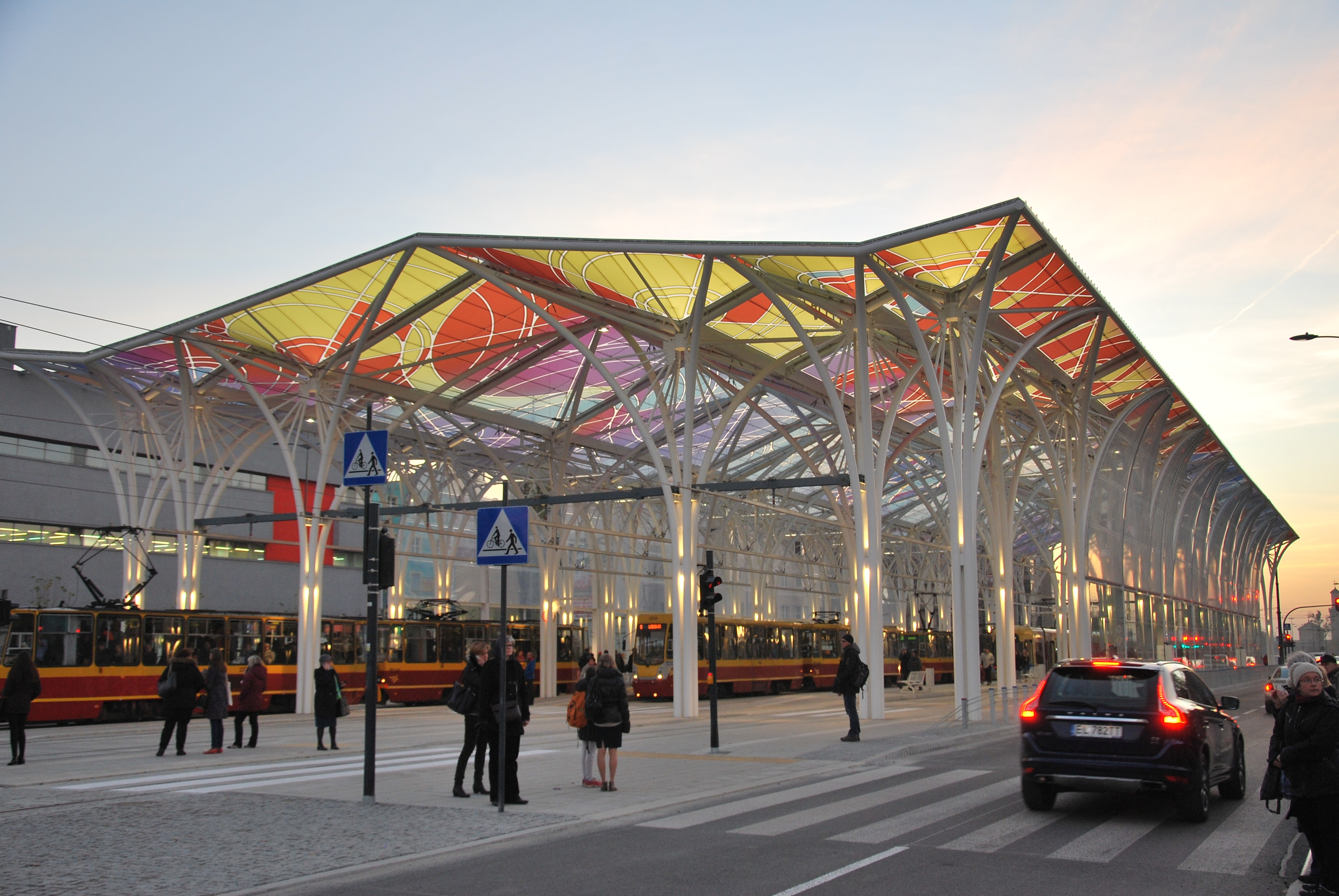
Piotrkowska Centrum tram station, also known as "The Unicorn Stable"

The Municipal Transport Company – Łódź (Miejskie Przedsiębiorstwo Komunikacyjne – Łódź), owned by the Łódź City Government, is responsible for operating 58 bus routes and 19 tram lines. The tram network is one of the longest in the country and was the first electrified cable tramway in Congress Poland, beginning its operation on 23 December 1898. The regional tramway network also connects Łódź with the adjacent cities of Pabianice (since 2023) and Konstantynów Łódzki (since 2024), which are within the Łódź Agglomeration. The rolling stock largely comprises older but modernised wagons by Konstal and newer Polish-manufactured types such as Pesa Swing and Moderus Gamma. Among the popular models for buses are Mercedes Conecto LF and Solaris Urbino 18.

==== Rail ====
Łódź has a number of long distance and local railway stations. There are two main stations in the city, but with no direct rail connection between them—a legacy of 19th-century railway network planning. Originally constructed in 1866, the centrally located Łódź Fabryczna was a terminus station for a branch line of the Warsaw–Vienna railway, whereas Łódź Kaliska was built more than thirty years later on the central section of the Warsaw-Kalisz railway. For this reason most intercity train traffic goes to this day through Łódź Kaliska station, despite its relative distance from the city centre, and Łódź Fabryczna serves mainly as a terminal station for trains to Warsaw. The situation will be remedied in 2026 after the construction of a tunnel connecting the two, which is likely to make Łódź Poland's main railway hub. The tunnel will additionally serve Łódź Commuter Railway, providing a rapid transit system for the city, dubbed the Łódź Metro by the media and local authorities. Three new stations are being constructed on the underground line, one serving the needs of the Manufaktura complex, another one serving Koziny neighbourhood and the third one located in the area of Piotrkowska Street.

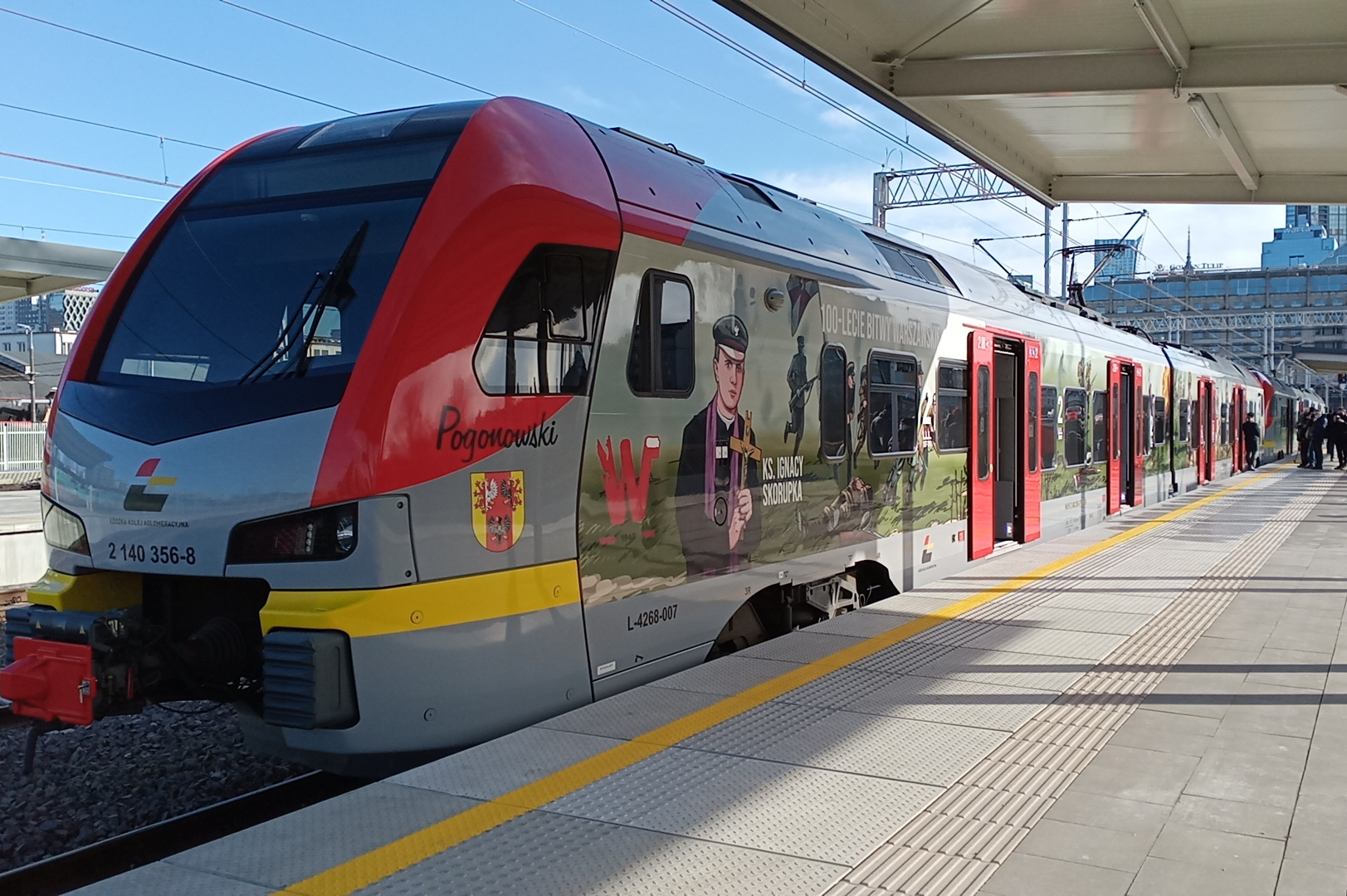
Łódź Agglomeration Railway is a commuter and regional rail service in Łódź

In December 2016, a few years after the demolition of the old building of Łódź Fabryczna station, a new underground station was opened. It is considered to be the largest and most modern of all train stations in Poland and is designed to handle increased traffic after the construction of the tunnel. It also serves as a multimodal transport hub, featuring an underground intercity bus station, and is integrated with a new transport interchange serving taxis and local trams and buses. The construction of the new Łódź Fabryczna station was part of a broader project of urban renewal known as Nowe Centrum Łodzi (New Centre of Łódź).

The third-largest train station in Łódź is Łódź Widzew. There are also many other stations and train stops in the city, many of which were upgraded as part of the Łódź Agglomeration Railway commuter rail project. The rail service, founded as part of a major regional rail upgrade and owned by Łódź Voivodeship, operates on routes to Kutno, Sieradz, Skierniewice, Łowicz, and on selected days to Warsaw, with plans for further expansion after the construction of the tunnel.

== Education ==
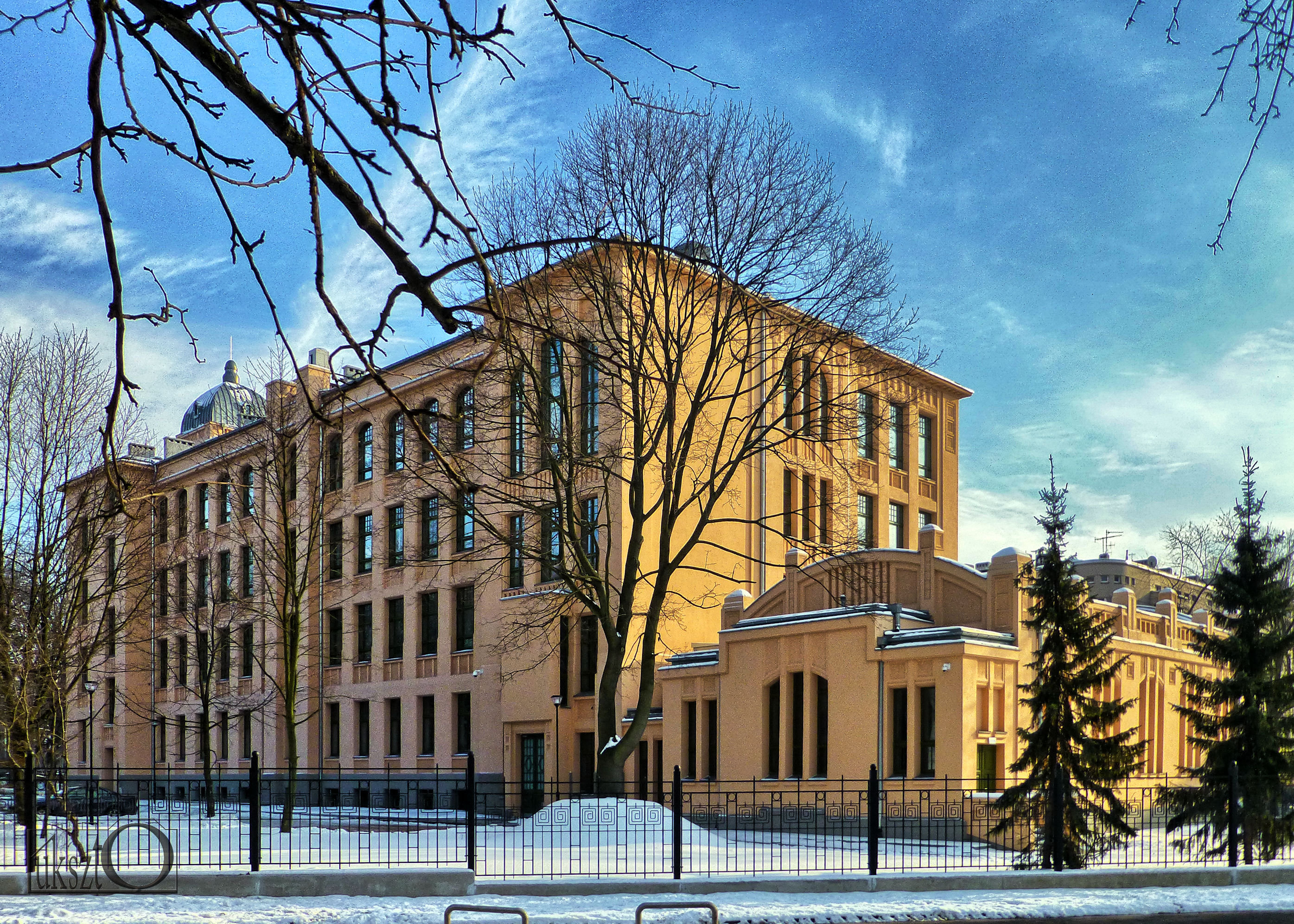
University of Łódź rector's office

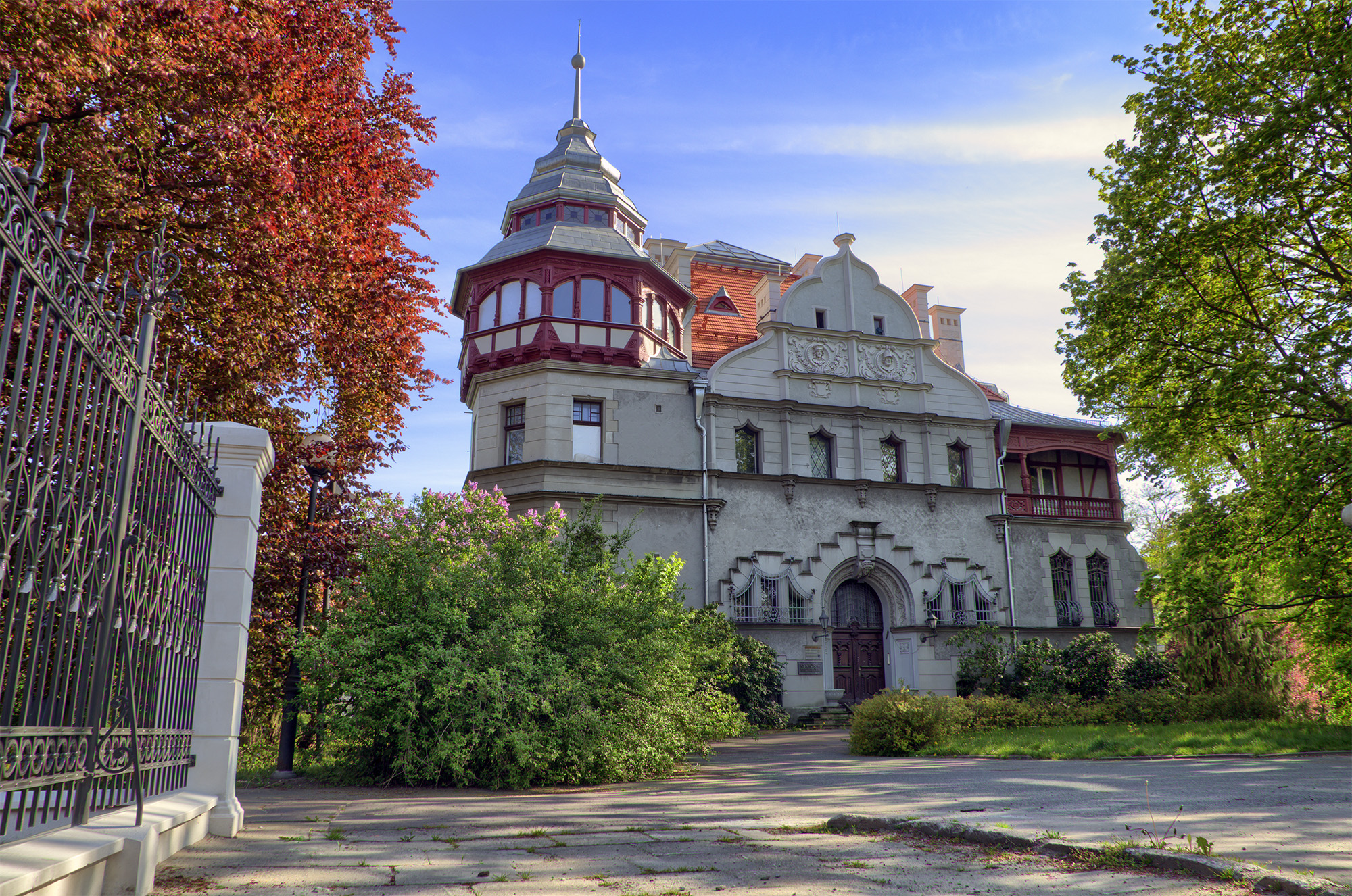
Łódź University of Technology rector's office

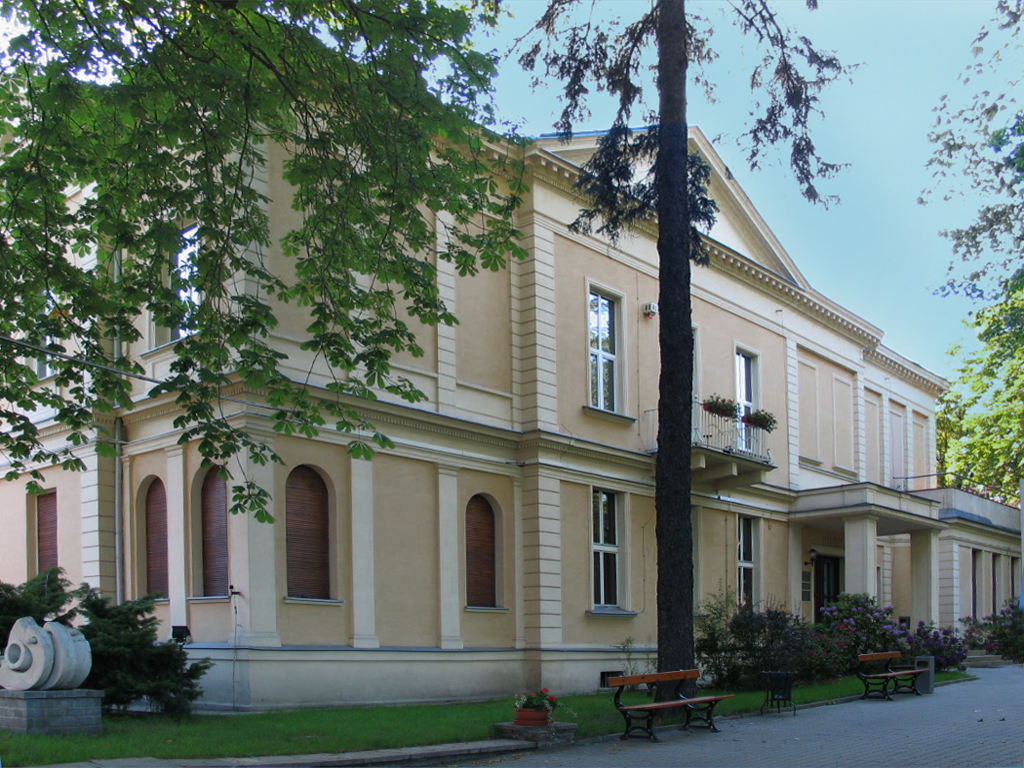
National Film School

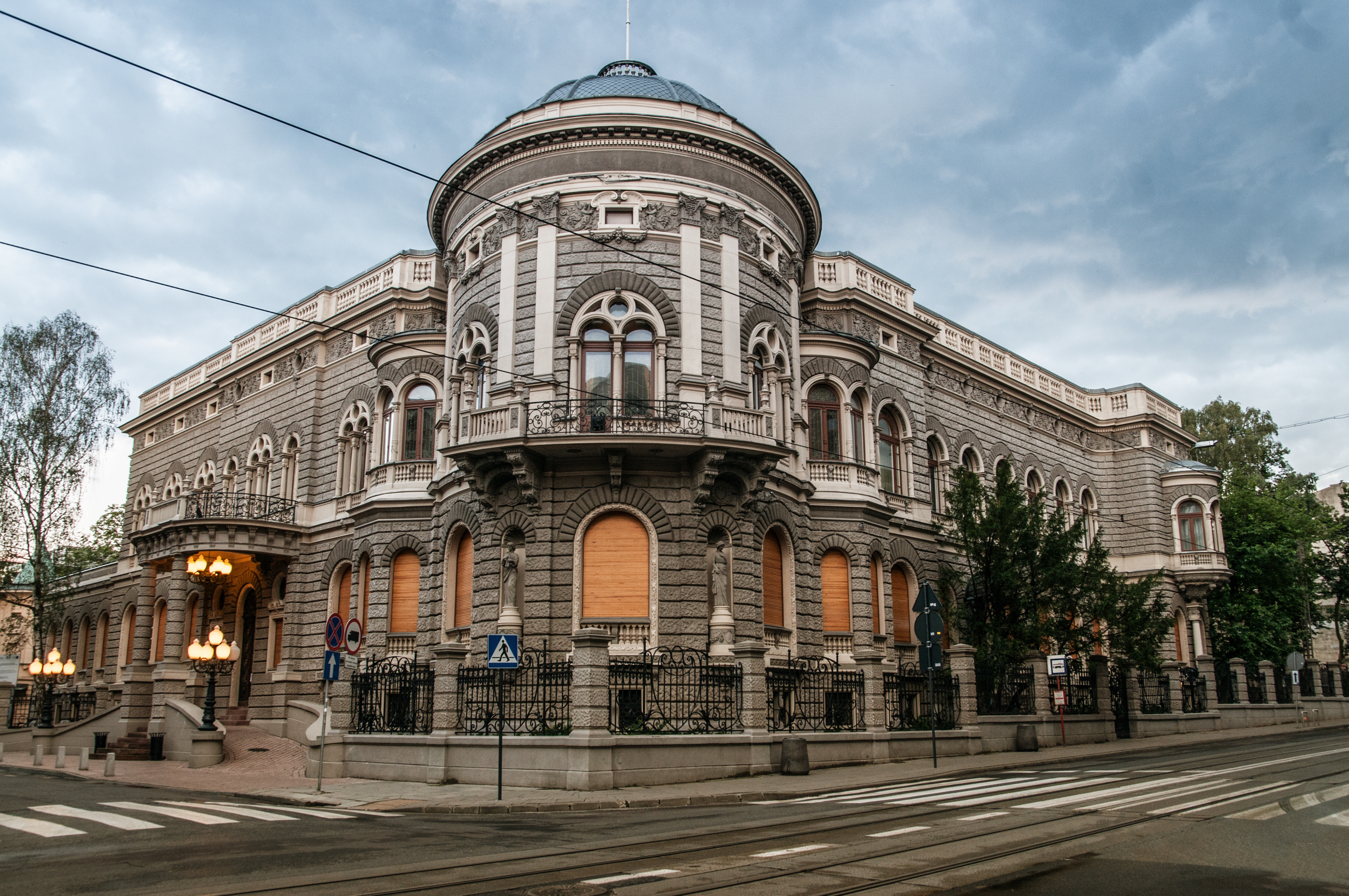
Academy of Music in Łódź

Łódź is a thriving centre of academic life. Łódź hosts three major state-owned universities, six higher education establishments operating for more than a half of the century, and a number of smaller schools of higher education. The tertiary institutions with the most students in Łódź include:

- University of Łódź (UŁ – Uniwersytet Łódzki)
- Lodz University of Technology (PŁ – Politechnika Łódzka)
- Medical University of Łódź (Uniwersytet Medyczny w Łodzi)
- National Film School in Łódź (Państwowa Wyższa Szkoła Filmowa, Telewizyjna i Teatralna w Łodzi)
- Academy of Music in Łódź (Akademia Muzyczna im. Grażyny i Kiejstuta Bacewiczów w Łodzi)
- Academy of Fine Arts In Łódź (Akademia Sztuk Pięknych im. Wł. Strzemińskiego w Łodzi)

In the 2018 general ranking of state-owned tertiary education institutions in Poland, the University of Łódź came 20th (6th place among universities) and Lodz University of Technology 12th (6th place among technical universities). The Medical University of Łódź was ranked 5th among Polish medical universities. Leading courses taught in Łódź include administration (3rd place), law (4th) and biology (4th).

There is also a number of private-owned institutions of higher learning in Łódź. The largest of these are the University of Social Sciences (Społeczna Akademia Nauk) and the University of Humanities and Economics in Łódź (Akademia Humanistyczno-Ekonomiczna w Łodzi). In the 2018 ranking of private universities in Poland the former was ranked 9th, and the latter 23rd.

=== National Film School in Łódź ===
The Leon Schiller National Higher School of Film, Television and Theatre in Łódź (Państwowa Wyższa Szkoła Filmowa, Telewizyjna i Teatralna im. Leona Schillera w Łodzi) is the most notable academy for future actors, directors, photographers, camera operators and TV staff in Poland. It was founded on 8 March 1948 and was initially planned to be moved to Warsaw as soon as the city was rebuilt following the Warsaw Uprising. However, in the end the school remained in Łódź and became one of the best-known institutions of higher education in the city.

At the end of the Second World War Łódź was the only large Polish city besides Kraków which war had not destroyed. The creation of the National Film School gave Łódź a role of greater importance from a cultural viewpoint, which before the war had belonged exclusively to Warsaw and Kraków. Early students of the School include the directors Andrzej Munk, Roman Polanski, Andrzej Wajda, Kazimierz Karabasz (one of the founders of the so-called Black Series of Polish Documentary) and Janusz Morgenstern, who at the end of the 1950s became famous as one of the founders of the Polish Film School of Cinematography.

=== Libraries ===
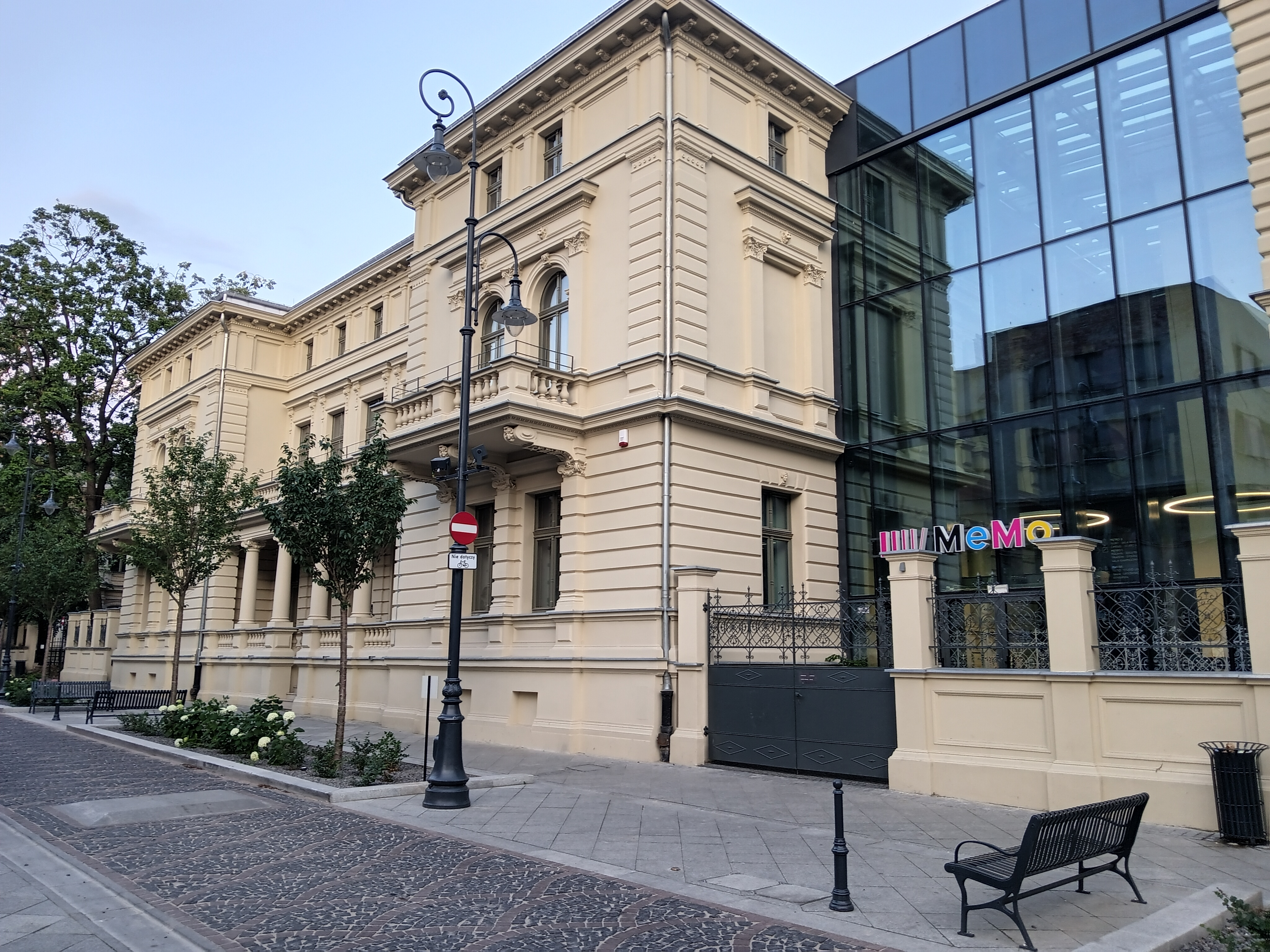
Mediateka MeMo, main entrance at 5 Stanisław Moniuszko Street

Łódź is home to libraries operated by universities, research institutions, the Łódź Voivodeship government, and the municipal government. Several academic libraries are members of the Łódź Academic Library Network (Łódzka Akademicka Sieć Biblioteczna).

Academic libraries include University of Łódź Library, Łódź University of Technology Library, Medical University of Łódź Library, Academy of Humanities and Economics Library, Grażyna and Kiejstut Bacewicz Academy of Music Library, Władysław Strzemiński Academy of Fine Arts Library, Leon Schiller National Film, Television and Theatre School Library, and Higher Seminary in Łódź Library. The Leon Schiller National Film, Television and Theatre School Library also operates Filmpolski.pl, an online database dedicated to Polish cinema.

Other libraries include the Marshal Józef Piłsudski Voivodeship Public Library, the Voivodeship Pedagogical Library, the libraries of the Polish Academy of Sciences' Centre of Molecular and Macromolecular Studies and the Nofer Institute of Occupational Medicine, and the Municipal Library in Łódź, which includes Mediateka MeMo.

== Culture ==
=== Landmarks and events ===
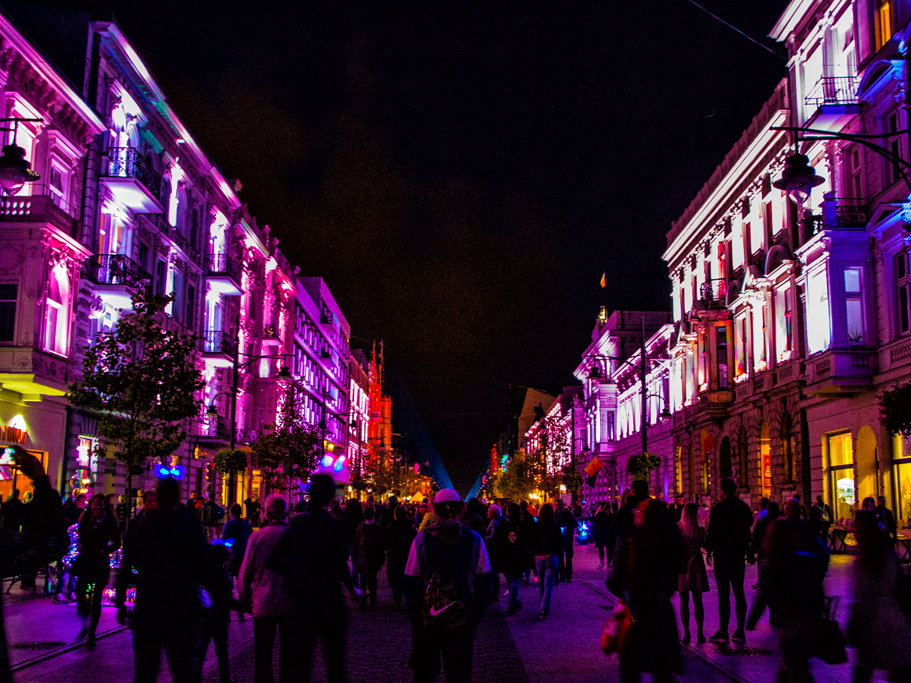
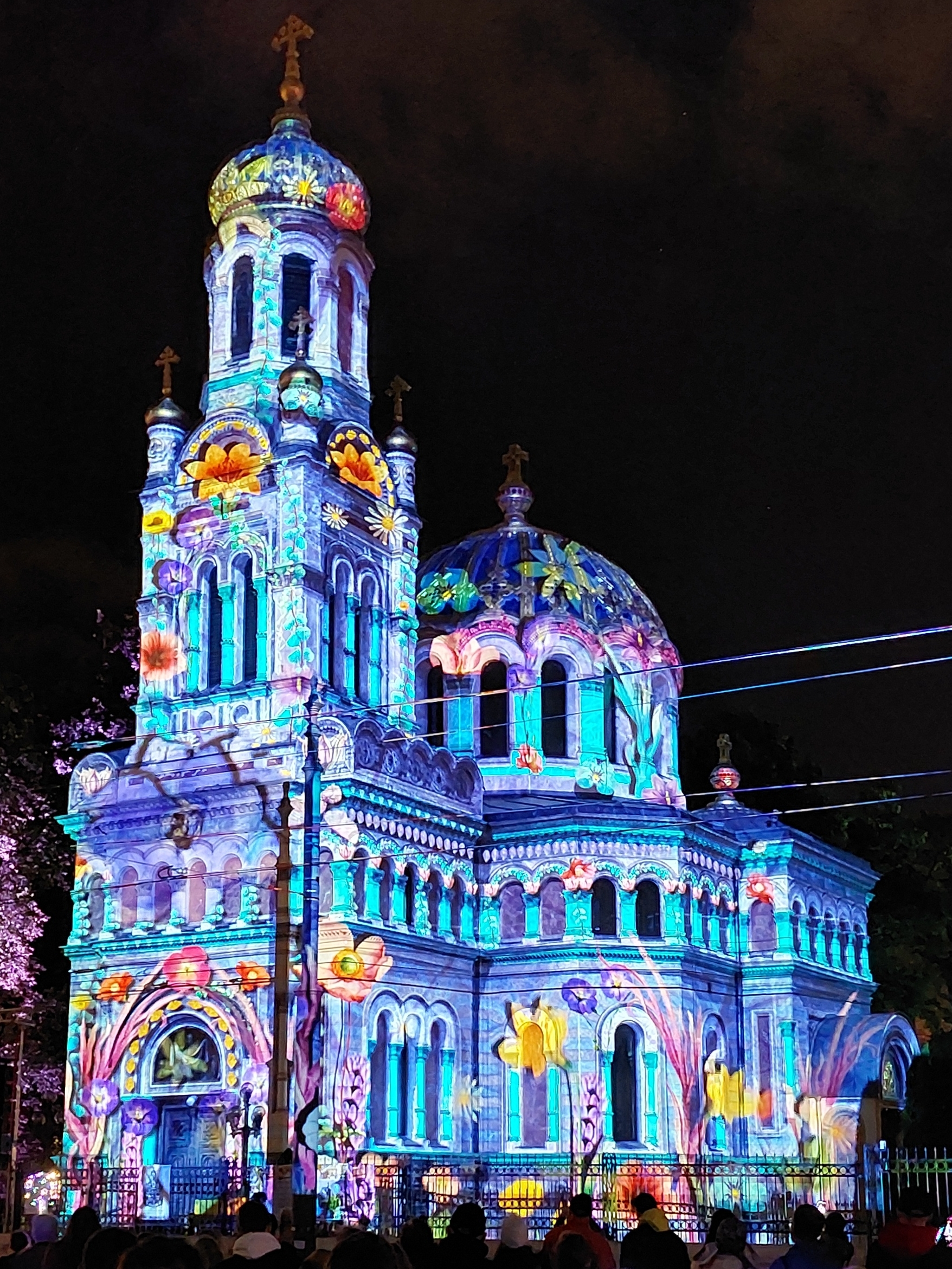
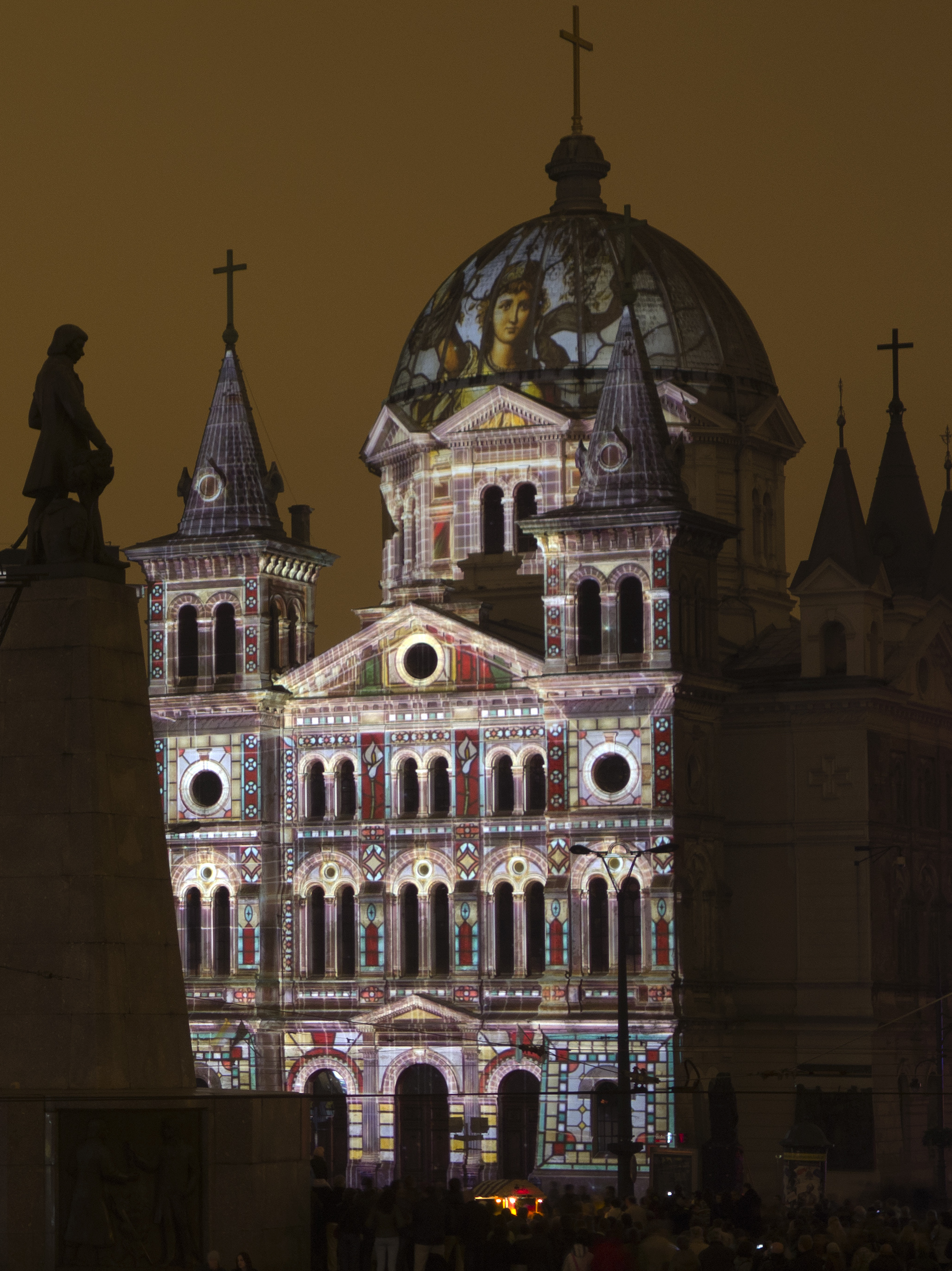
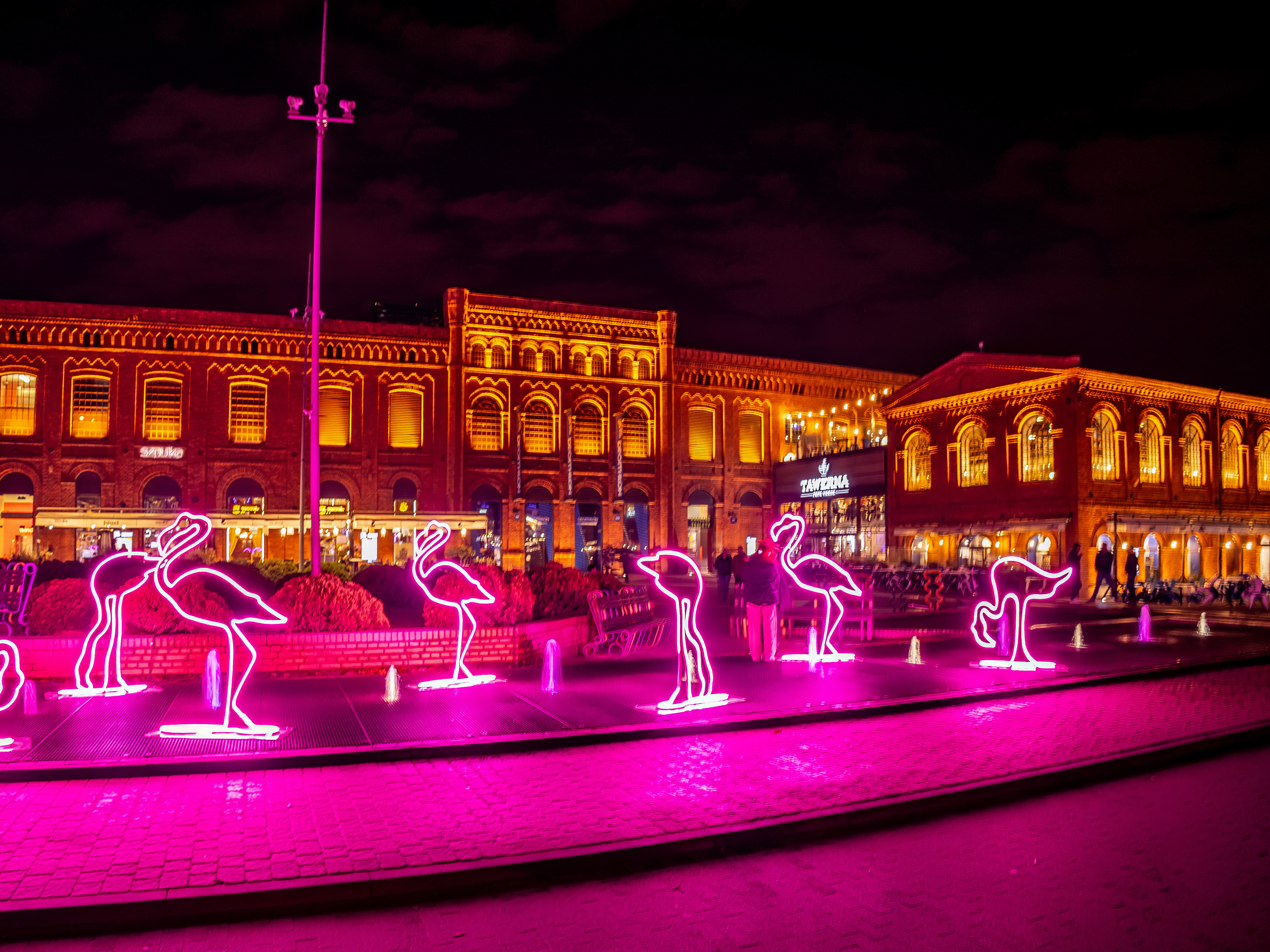
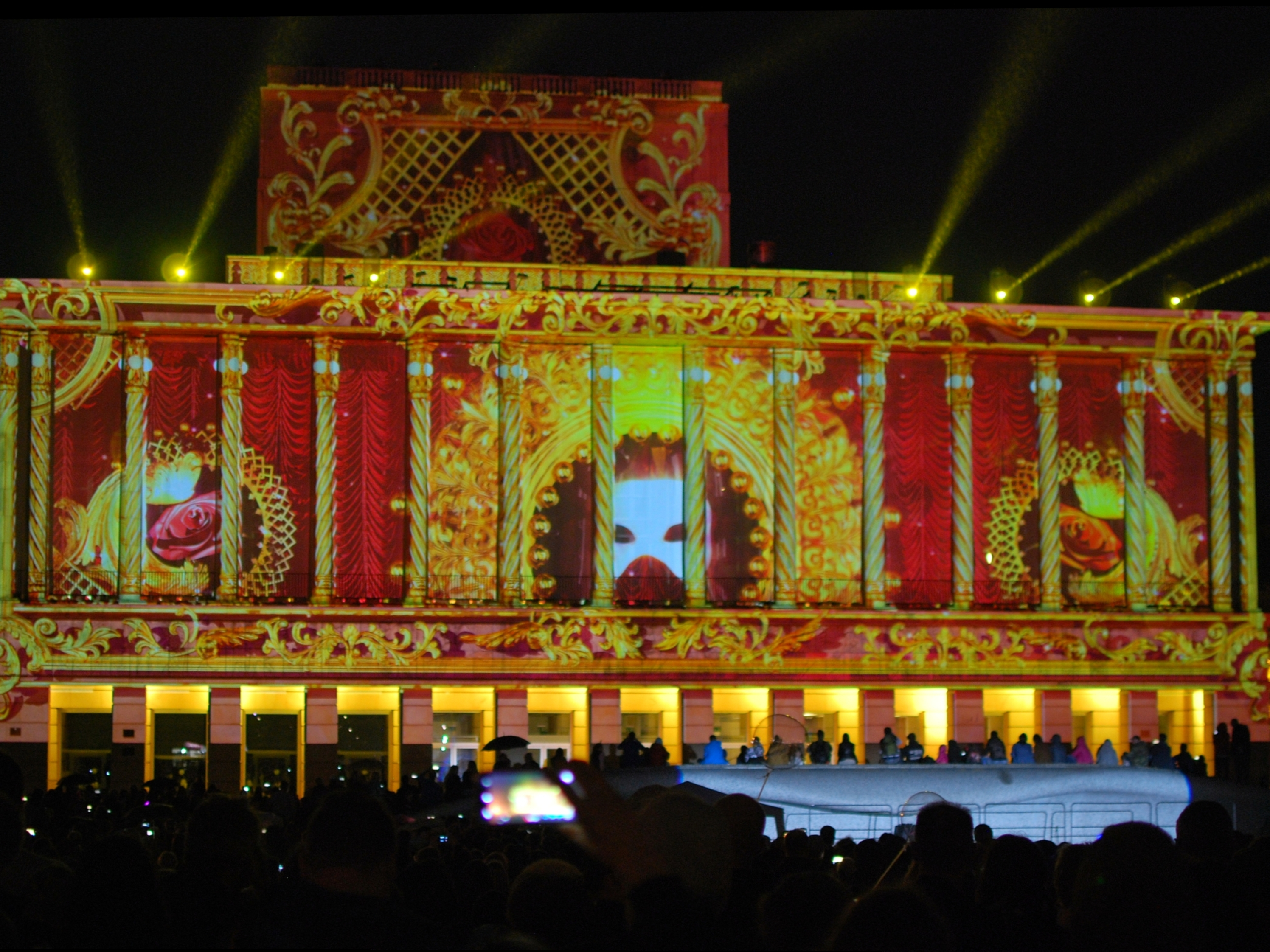
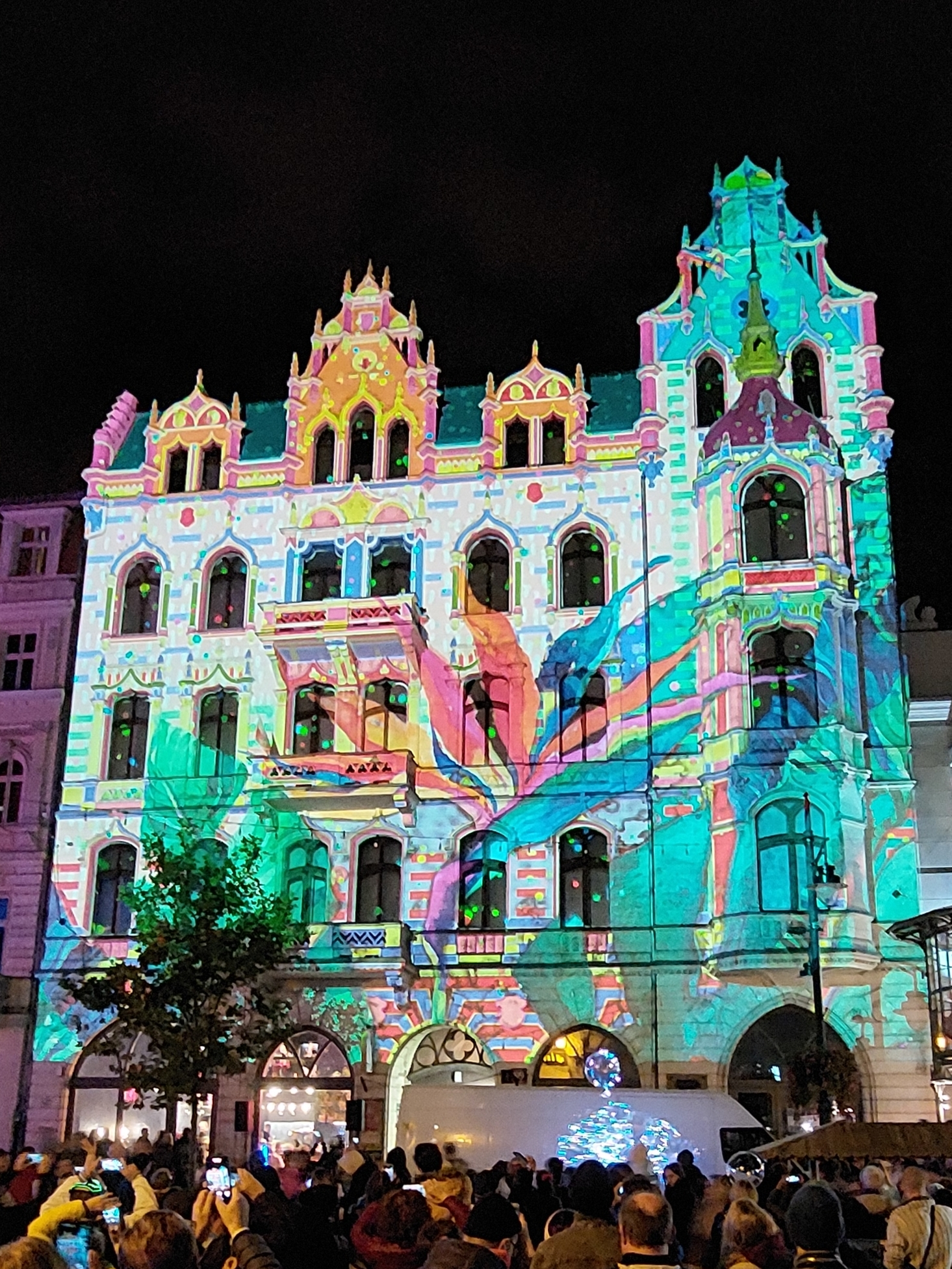
Light Move Festival in Łódź

The most notable and recognizable landmark of the city is Piotrkowska Street, which remains the high-street and main tourist attraction in the city, runs north to south for a little over five kilometres (3.1 miles). This makes it one of the longest commercial streets in the world. Most of the building façades, many of which date back to the 19th century, have been renovated. It is the site of most restaurants, bars and cafes in Łódź's city centre. Important monuments of architecture along Piotrkowska Street are the Old Town Hall, the Descent Of The Holy Spirit Church, the Łódź Catholic Cathedral and the St. Matthew's Lutheran Church. Other important churches in the city centre include the Alexander Nevsky Orthodox Cathedral and the Karol Scheibler's Chapel, Lutheran part of Ogrodowa Street Cemetery.

Many neglected tenement houses and factories throughout the entire city centre have been renovated in recent years as part of the ongoing revitalization project run by the local authorities. The best example of urban regeneration in Łódź is the Manufaktura complex, occupying a large area of a former cotton factory dating back to the nineteenth century. The site, which was the heart of Izrael Poznański's industrial empire, hosts a shopping mall, numerous restaurants, 4-star hotel, multiplex cinema, factory museum, bowling and fitness facilities and a science exhibition centre. Opened in 2006, it quickly became a centre of cultural entertainment and shopping, as well as a recognizable city landmark attracting both domestic and foreign tourists. Another example is the former factory of Karl Scheibler on Księży Młyn, which was turned into a mixed-use complex of offices and housing. Rosa's Passage is another example of this: artist Joanna Rajkowska covered a tenement with mirrors, which has since become a tourist attraction.

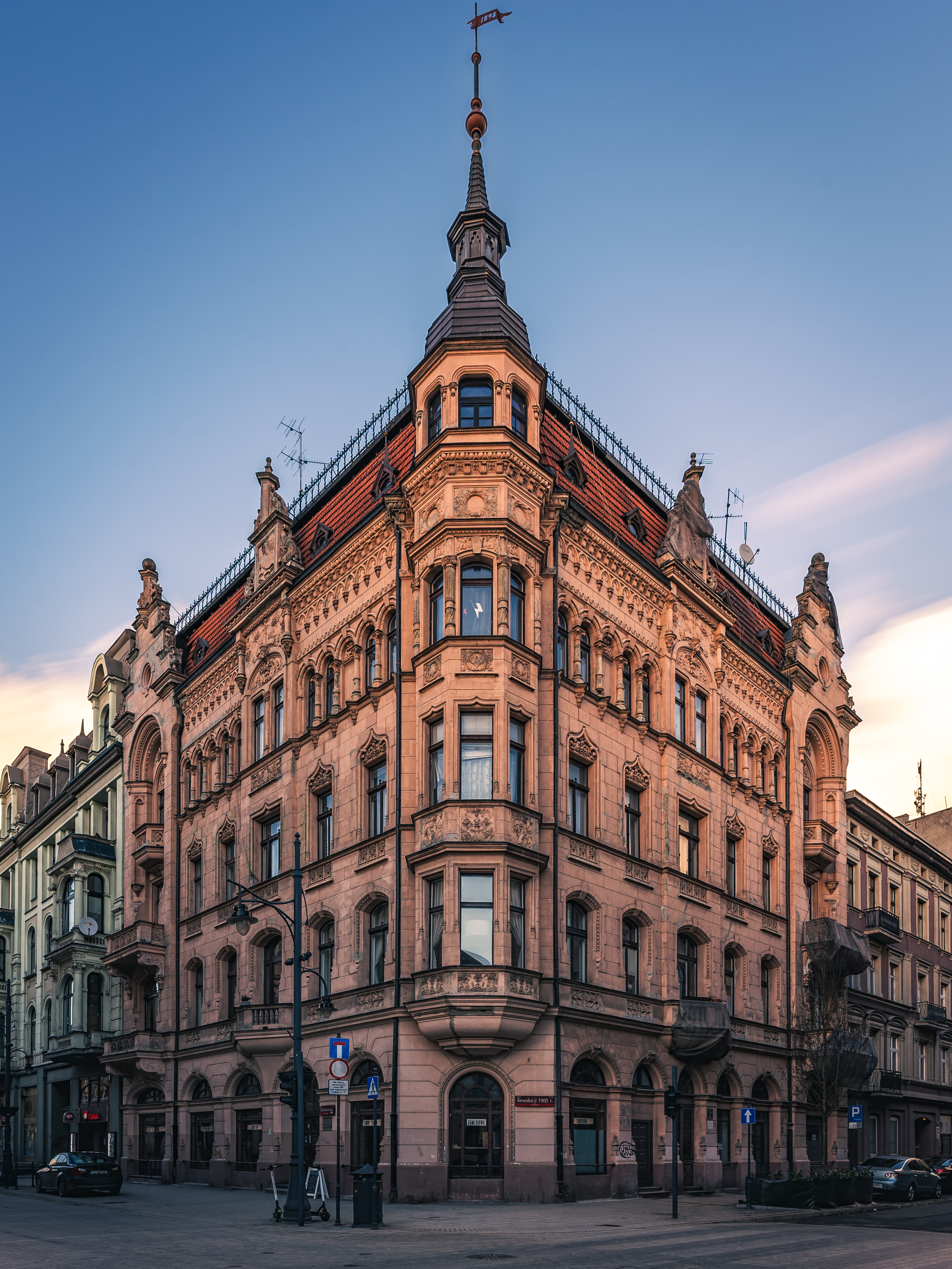
Dawid Sendrowicz's tenement house presents historical architecture, which is characterized by neo-Gothic, neo-Baroque and Neo-Renaissance elements.

Łódź also provides plenty of green spaces for recreation. Woodland areas cover 9.61% of the city, with parks taking up an additional 2.37% of the area of Łódź (as of 2014). Las Łagiewnicki ('Łagiewnicki Forest') is recognized as the largest forested area within the administrative borders of any city in Europe. It has an area of 1,245 ha and is cut across by a number of hiking trails that traverse the hilly landscape on the western edge of Łódź Hills Landscape Park. A "natural complex which has remained nearly intact as oak-hornbeam and oak woodland," the forest is also rich in history, and its attractions include a Franciscan friary dating back to the early 18th century and two 17th-century wooden chapels.

Out of a total of 44 parks in Łódź (as of 2014), 11 have historical status, the oldest of them dating back to the middle of the 19th century. The largest of these, Józef Piłsudski Park (188.21 hectares (0.7267 sq mi)), is located near the Łódź Zoo and the city's botanical garden, and together with them it comprises an extensive green complex known as Zdrowie serving the recreational needs of the city. Another notable park located in Łódź is the Józef Poniatowski Park.

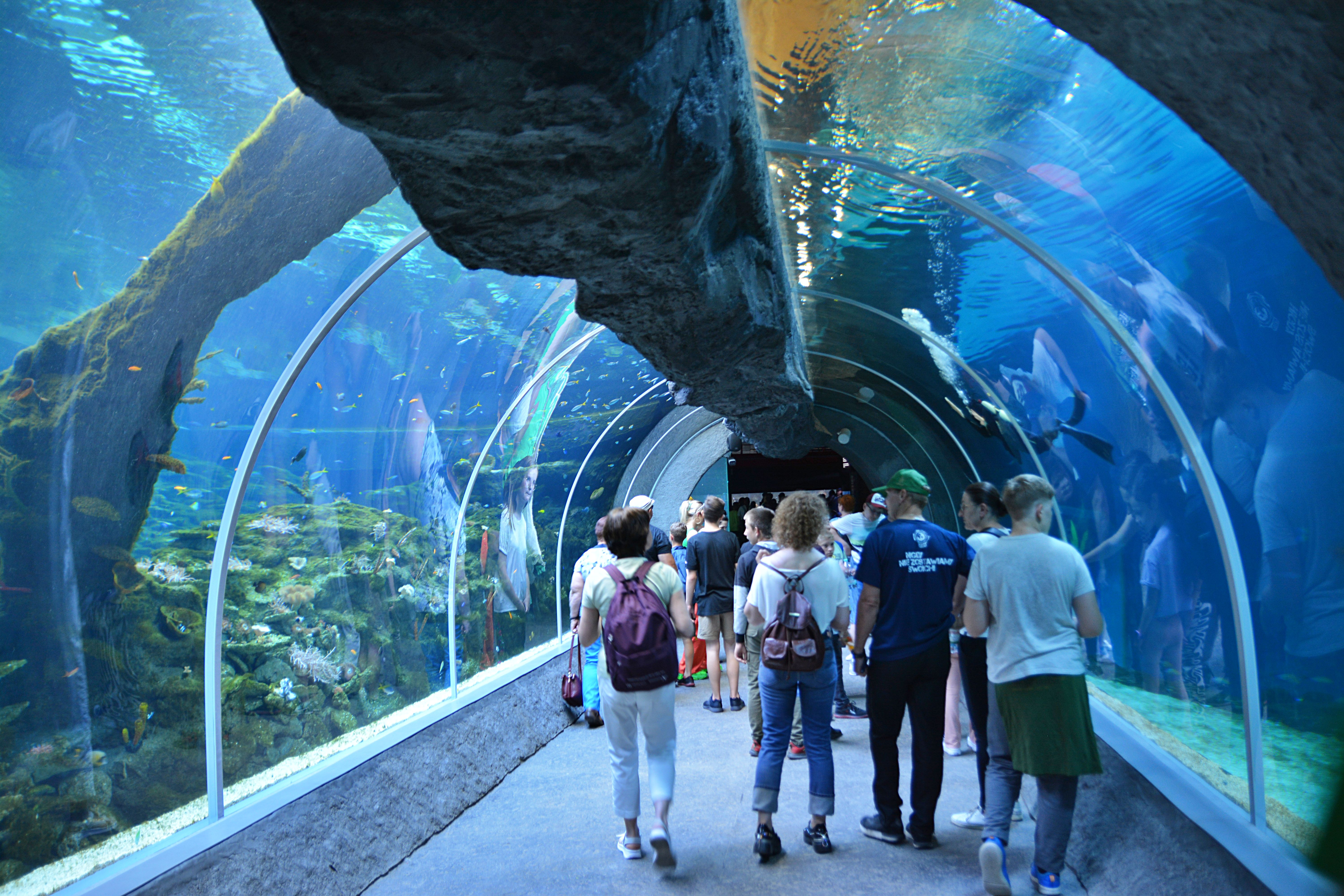
Orientarium in the Łódź Zoo, opened in 2022

The Jewish Cemetery at Bracka Street, one of the largest of its kind in Europe, was established in 1892. After the invasion of Poland by Nazi Germany in 1939, this cemetery became a part of Łódź's eastern territory known as the enclosed Łódź ghetto (Ghetto Field). Between 1940 and 1944, approximately 43,000 burials took place within the grounds of this rounded-up cemetery. In 1956, a monument by Muszko in memory of the victims of the Łódź Ghetto was erected at the cemetery. It features a smooth obelisk, a menorah, and a broken oak tree with leaves stemming from the tree (symbolizing death, especially death at a young age). As of 2014, the cemetery has an area of 39.6 hectares (98 acres). It contains approximately 180,000 graves, approximately 65,000 labelled tombstones, ohels and mausoleums. Many of these monuments have significant architectural value; 100 of these have been declared historical monuments and have been in various stages of restoration. The mausoleum of Izrael and Eleanora Poznański is perhaps the largest Jewish tombstone in the world and the only one decorated with mosaics.

=== Museums in Łódź ===
Primary cultural institutions

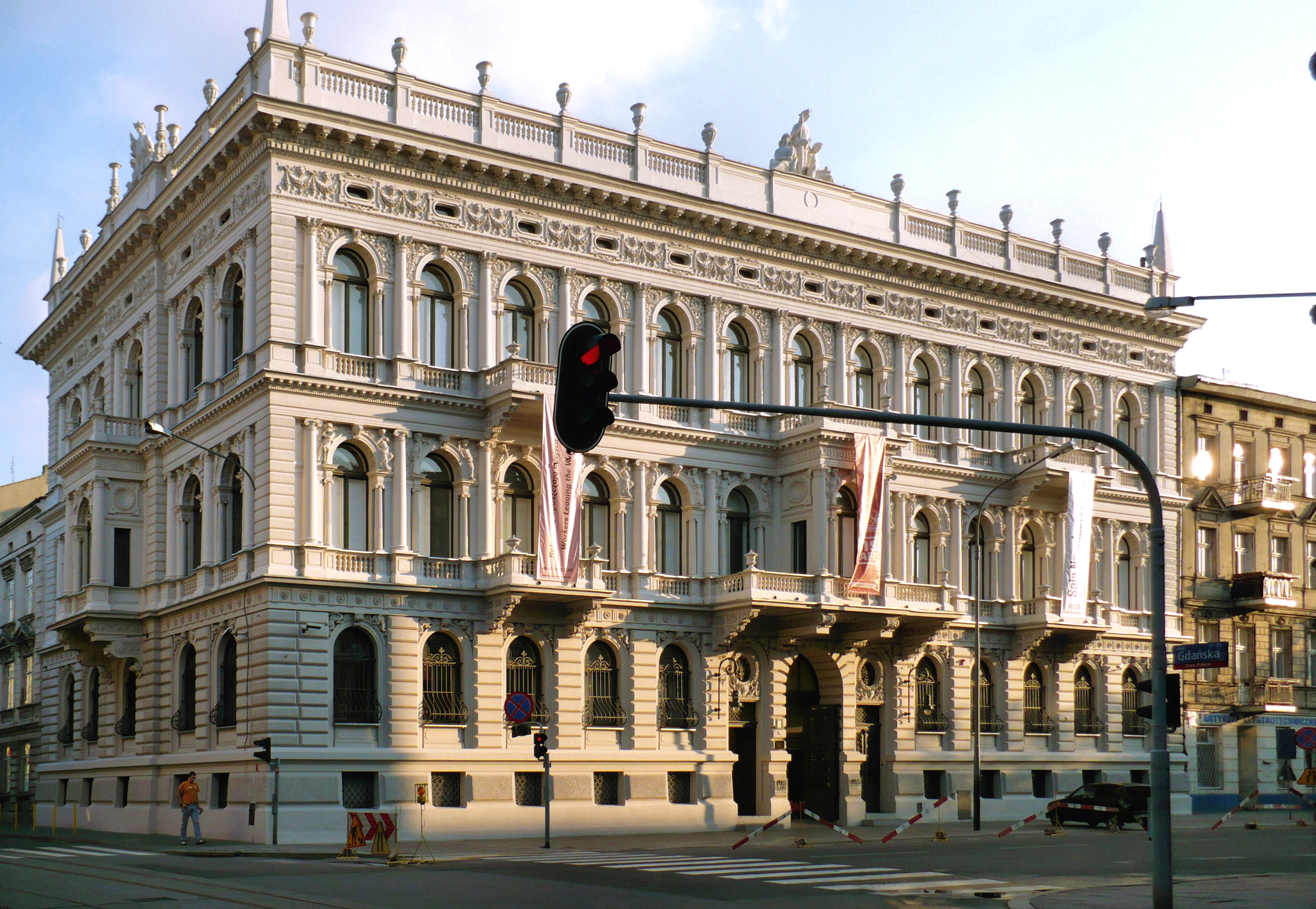
Museum of Art

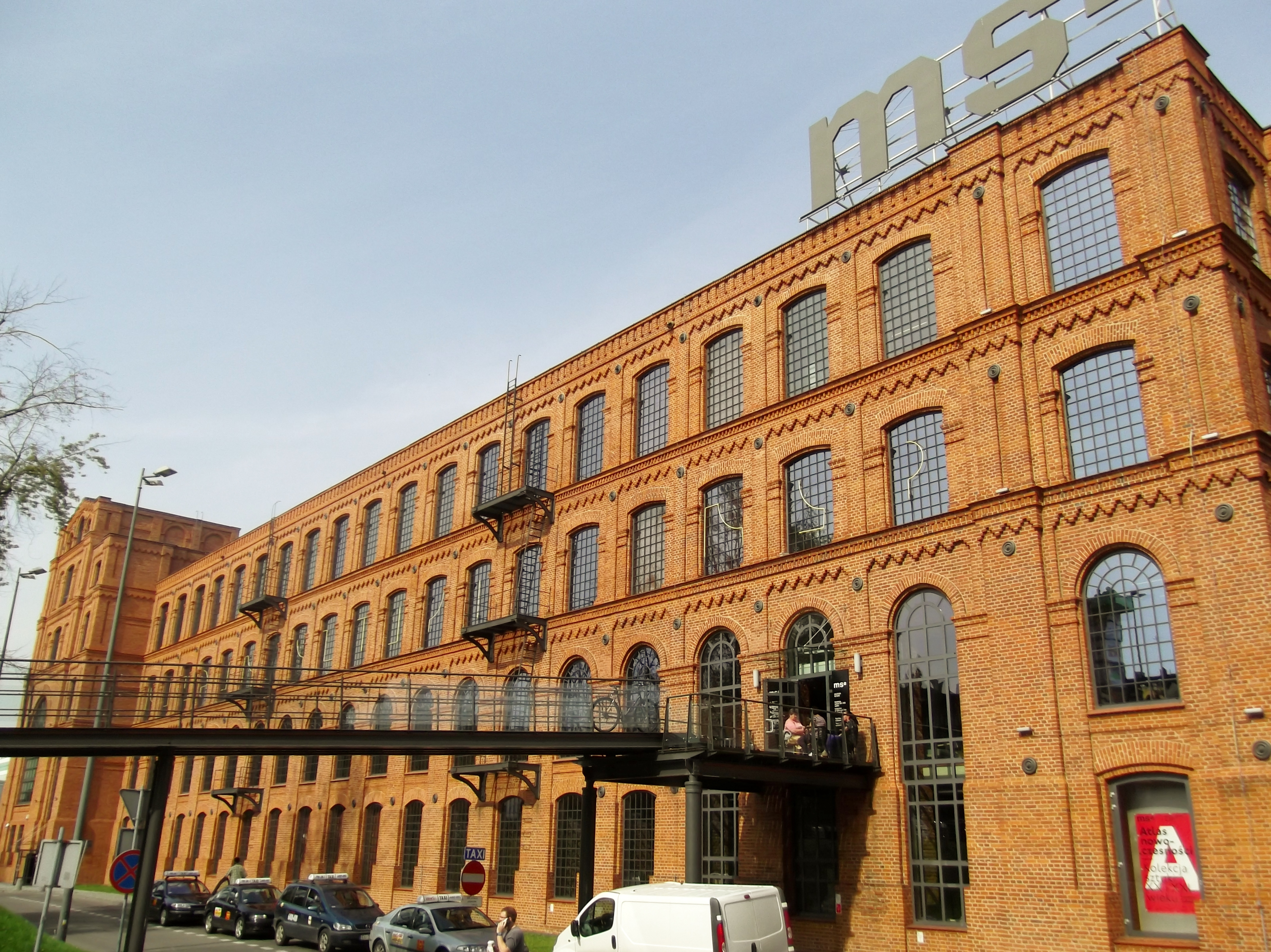
ms2 Muzeum Sztuki, gallery of modern art

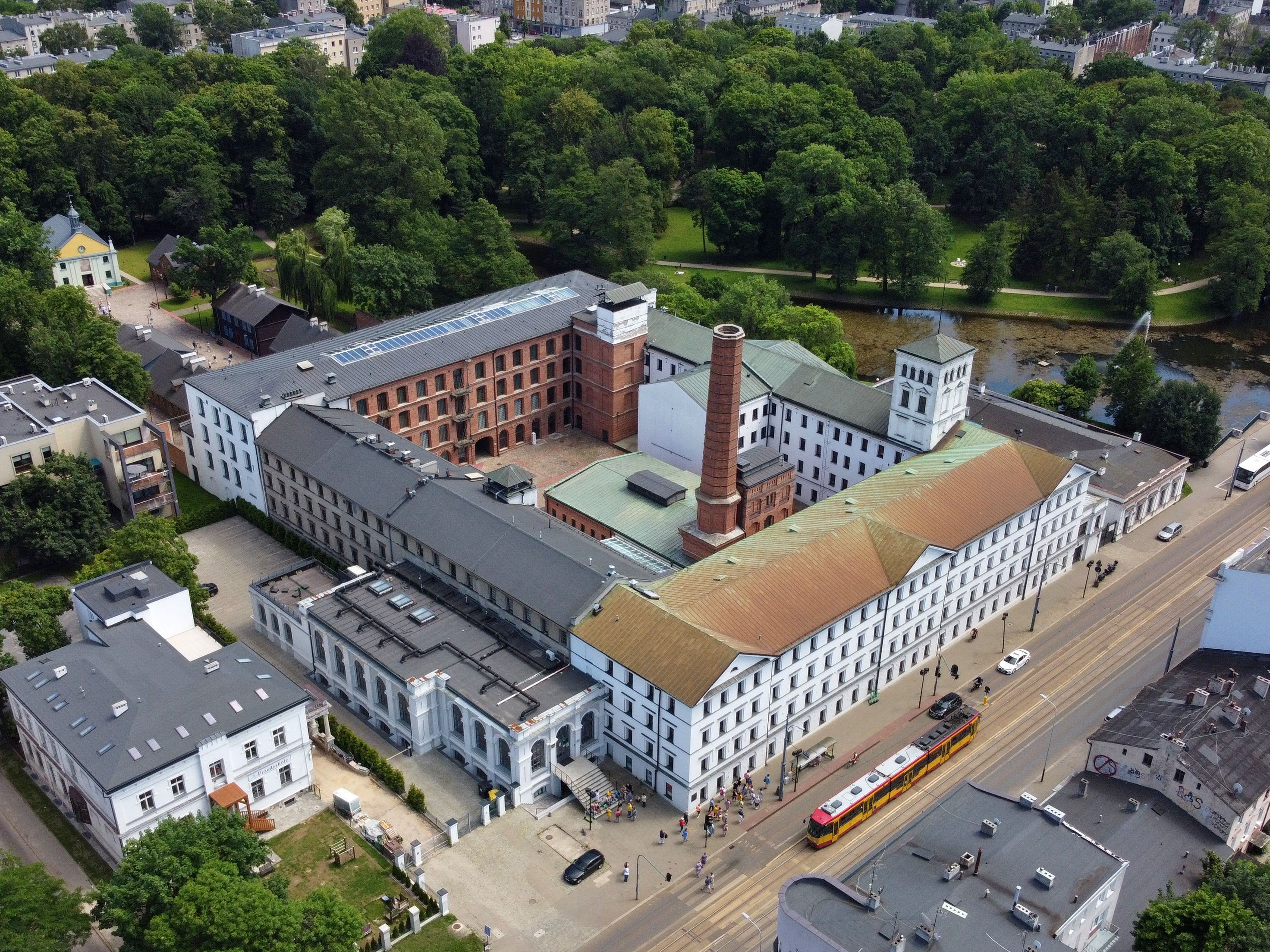
Central Museum of Textiles

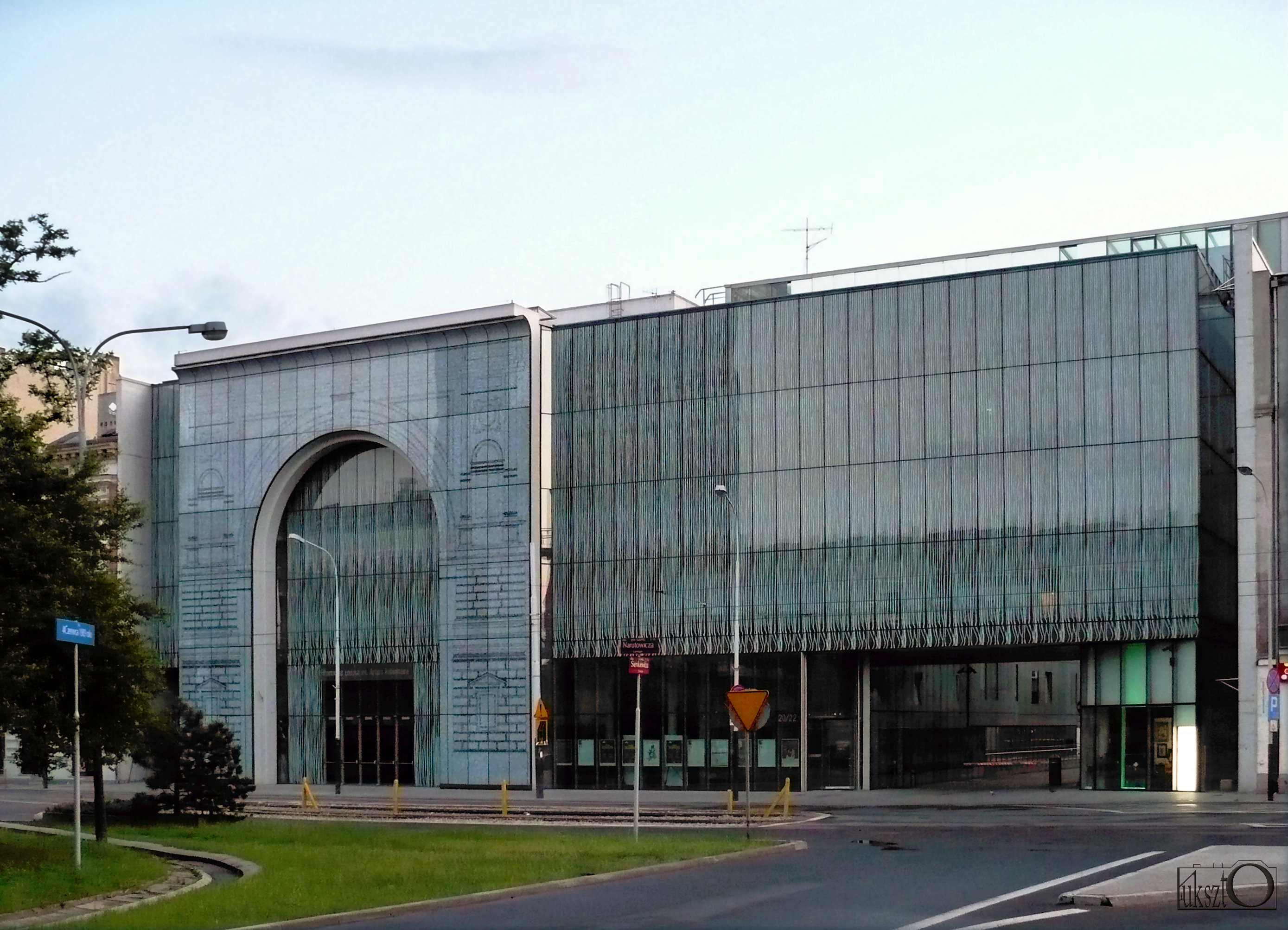
Łódź Philharmonic

- Archaeological and Ethnographic Museum
- Book Art Museum
- Central Museum of Textiles
- City of Lodz History Museum
- Film Museum
- Herbst Palace Museum
- Muzeum Sztuki (Museum of Art)
- Natural History Museum, University of Łódź
- Muzeum Tradycji Niepodległościowych (Independence Traditions Museum) with three parts:
  - Radegast train station
  - Mausoleum and museum in Radogoszcz – Radogoszcz prison
  - exhibition Kuźnia Romów (Roma forge) in former Łódź Ghetto
- The EC1 Łódź – City of Culture complex in a former power plant, which includes the Science and Technology Centre, the Centre for Comics and Interactive Narrative, as well as the National Centre for Film Culture which opened in 2023 as the largest institution devoted to cinematography in Poland.

Łódź has one of the best museums of modern art in Poland. Muzeum Sztuki has three branches, two of which (ms1 and ms2) display collections of 20th and 21st-century art. The newest addition to the museum, ms2 was opened in 2008 in the Manufaktura complex. The unique collection of the Museum is presented in an unconventional way. Instead of a chronological lecture on the development of art, works of art representing various periods and movements are arranged into a story touching themes and motifs important for the contemporary public. The third branch of Muzeum Sztuki, located in one of the city's many industrial palaces, also has more traditional art on display, presenting works by European and Polish masters such as Stanisław Wyspiański and Henryk Rodakowski.

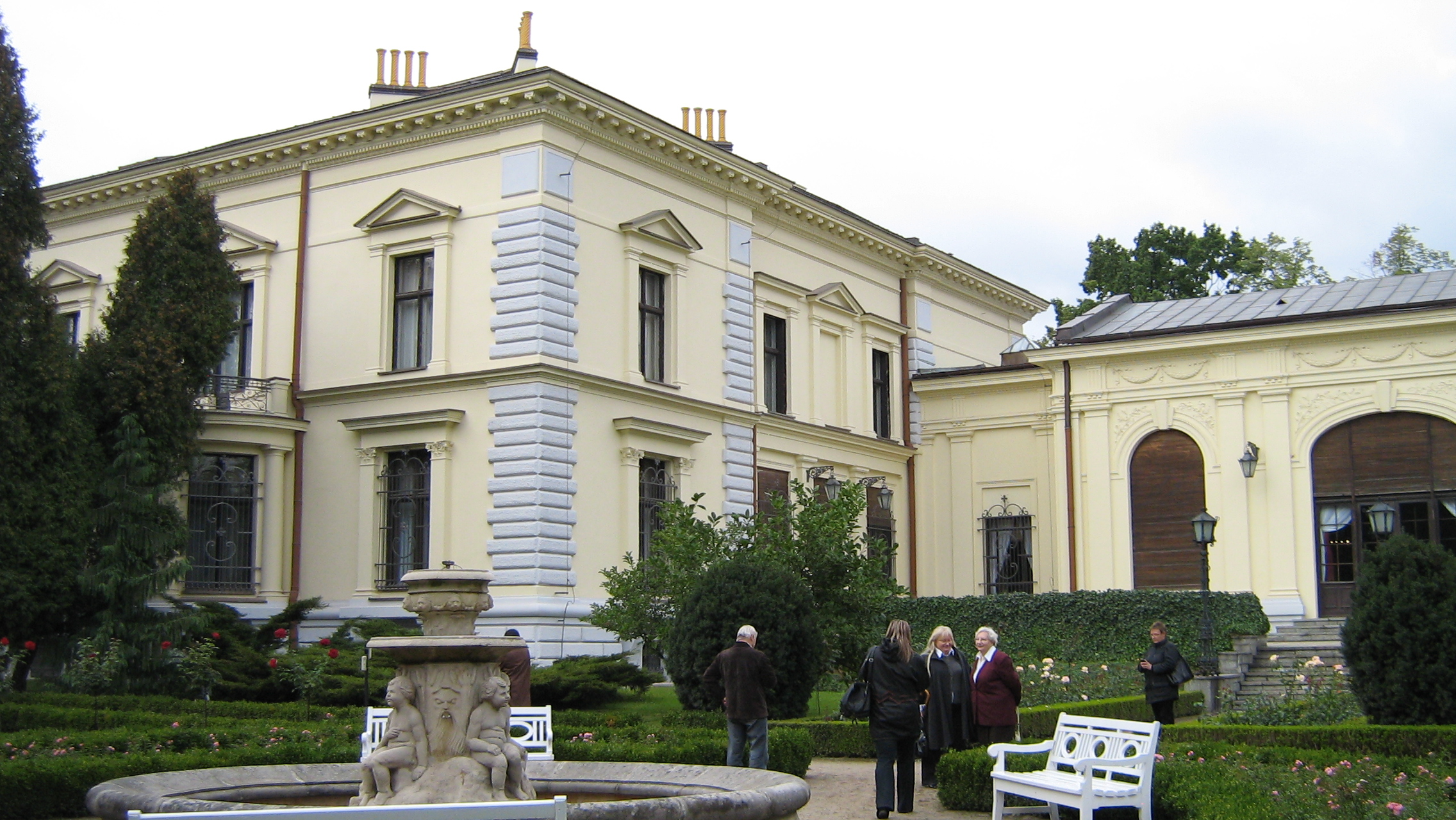
Herbst Palace, designed by Hilary Majewski, an art gallery within a historical mansion, which holds paintings from all over Europe

Among the 14 registered museums to be found in Łódź, there is the independent Book Art Museum, awarded the American Printing History Association's Institutional Award for 2015 for its outstanding contribution to the study, recording, preservation, and dissemination of printing history in Poland over the last 35 years. Other notable museums include the Central Museum of Textiles with its open-air display of wooden architecture, the Cinematography Museum, located in Scheibler Palace, and the Museum of Independence Traditions, occupying the building of a historical Tsarist prison from the late 19th century. A more unusual establishment, the Dętka museum offers tourists a chance to visit the municipal sewer designed in the early years of the 20th century by the British engineer William Heerlein Lindley.

=== Łódź in literature and cinema ===
Three major novels depict the development of industrial Łódź: Władysław Reymont's The Promised Land (1898), Joseph Roth's Hotel Savoy (1924) and Israel Joshua Singer's The Brothers Ashkenazi (1937). Roth's novel depicts the city on the eve of a workers' riot in 1919. Reymont's novel was made into a film by Andrzej Wajda in 1975. In the 1990 film Europa Europa, Solomon Perel's family flees pre-World War II Berlin and settles in Łódź. Paweł Pawlikowski's film Ida was partially shot in Łódź. Much of David Lynch's film Inland Empire was shot in Łódź. Chava Rosenfarb's Yiddish trilogy "The Tree of Life" (1972; English translation 1985) portrays life within the Łódź Ghetto.

=== Theatre ===
- Grand Theatre (Teatr Wielki)
- Stefan Jaracz Theatre (Teatr Stefana Jaracza)
- Schiller's Studio Theatre (Teatr Studyjny Schillera)

=== Cuisine and food ===
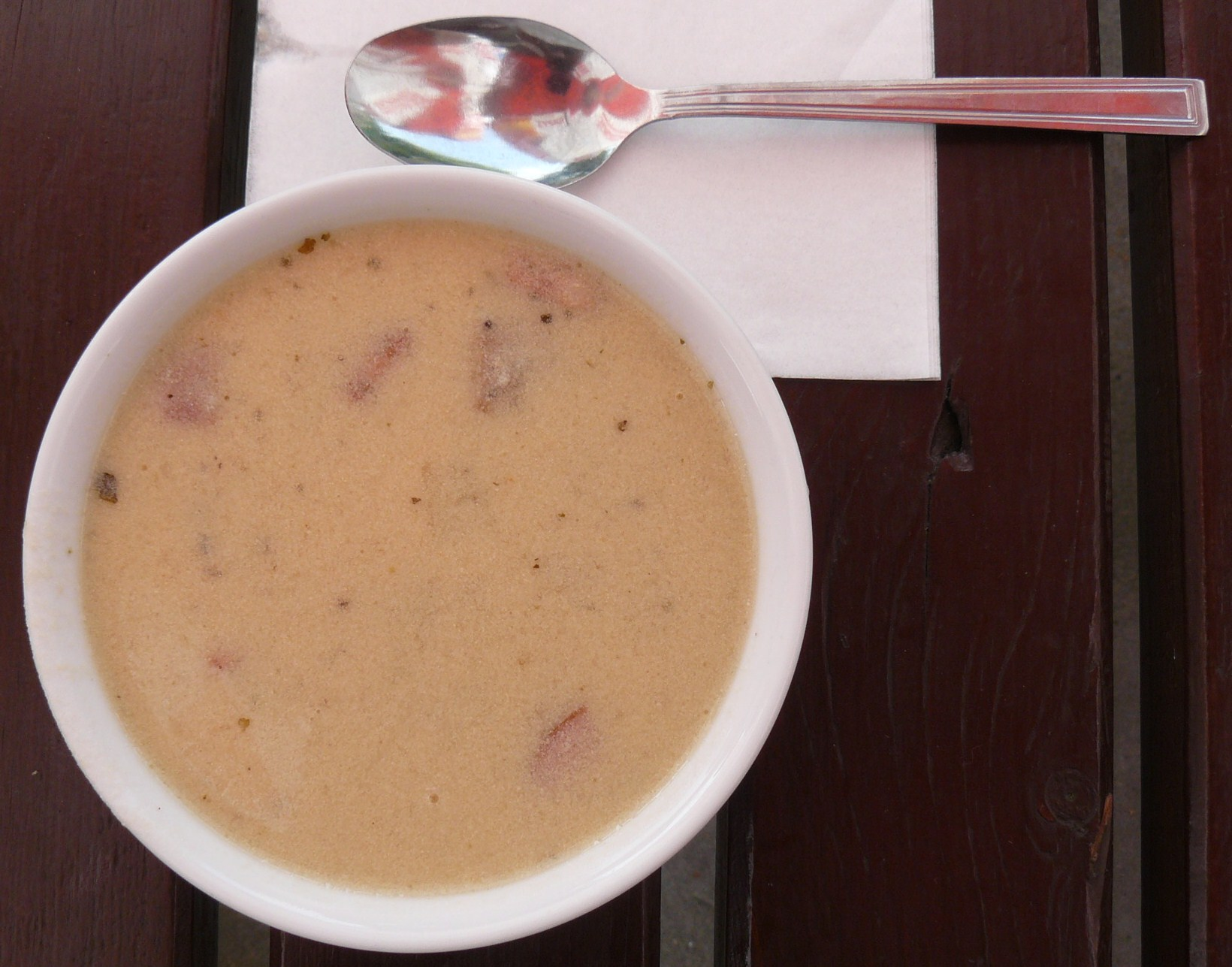
Zalewajka sour potato soup.

Among the traditional dishes of Łódź and the Łódź Voivodeship are zalewajka – a sour cereal and potato soup, often served with mushrooms, kielbasa sausage and bread – and cabbage soup (kapuśniak) served with potato dumplings and pork cracklings. These were once the staples of the working-class population employed in textile factories. Popular breads and baked goods include the angielka baguette roll and żulik bun with raisins. Aspic in various forms (galareta, zimne nóżki or drygle) was once a well-established comfort and party food in the city. Łódź and the surrounding region is also known for having a strong preference for mushroom soup over barszcz (borscht) for the Polish Wigilia (Christmas Eve) supper.

Major food venues are primarily located at Piotrkowska Street, for example the OFF Piotrkowska, a mixed-use complex, only allowing creative and independent business, situated in a heritage-listed red brick factory. Food trucks are a common sight around the city centre and several neighbourhoods.

=== Sport ===
Main sports venues

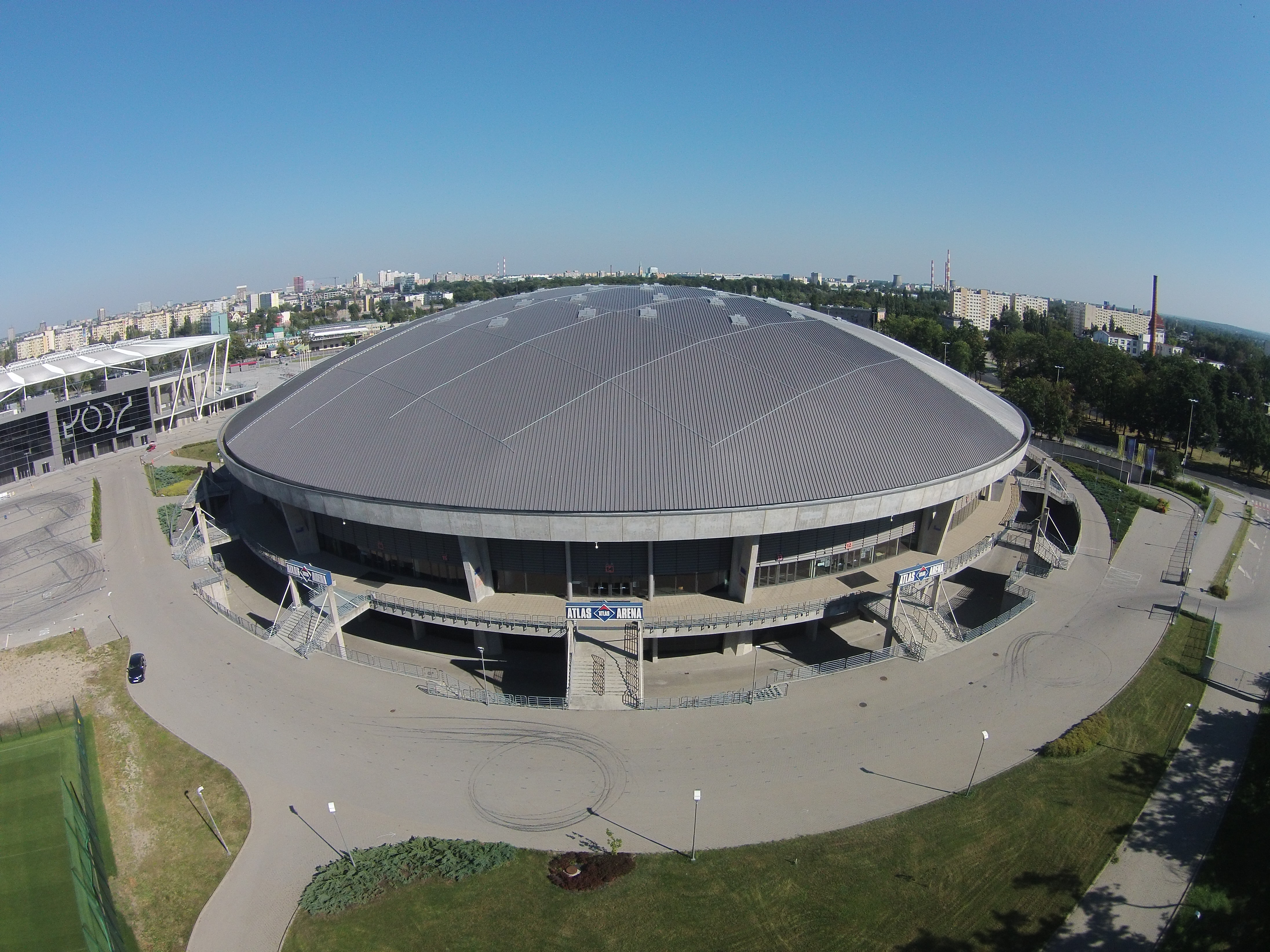
Atlas Arena, the main indoor arena of Łódź

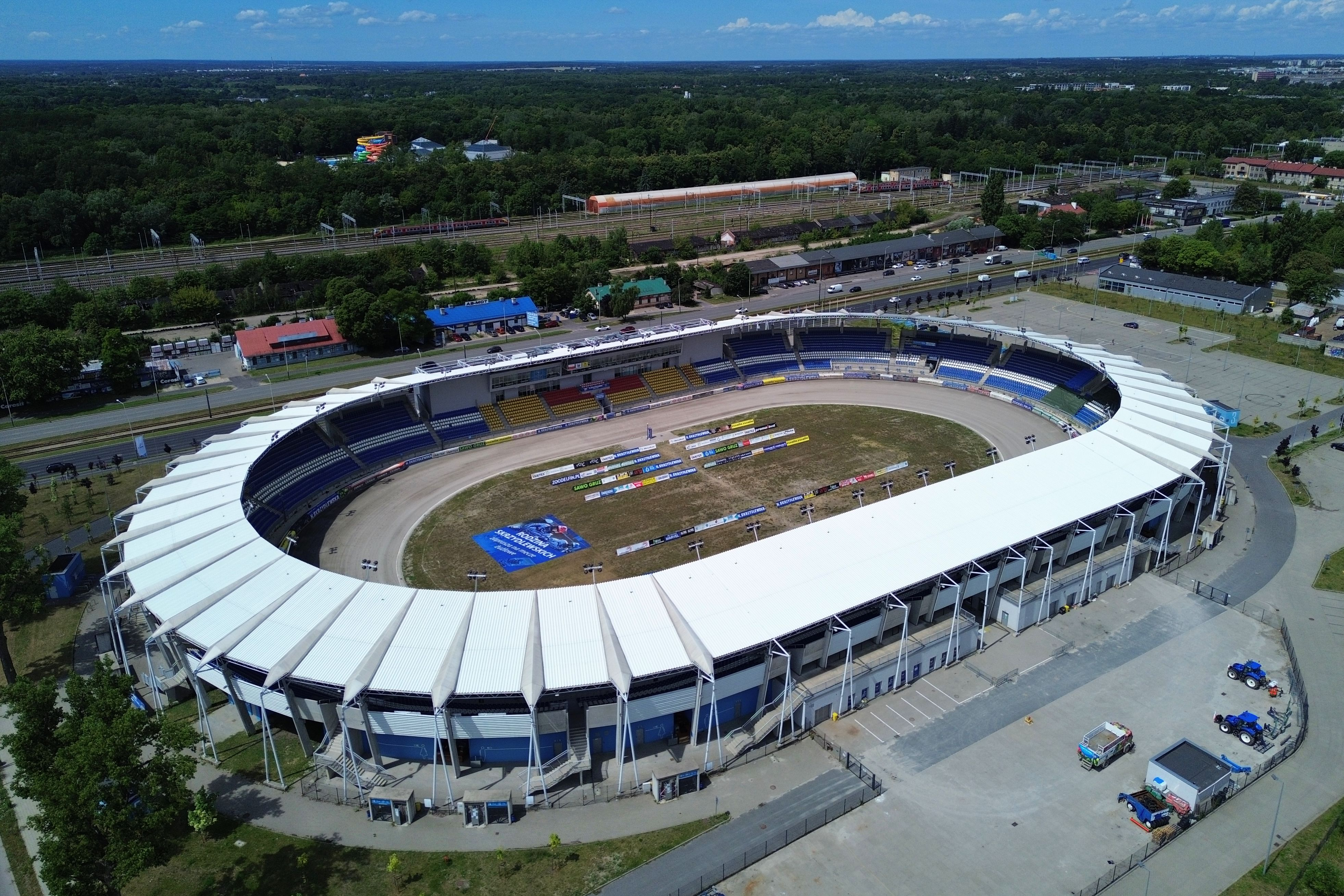
Moto Arena Łódź, home venue of Orzeł Łódź

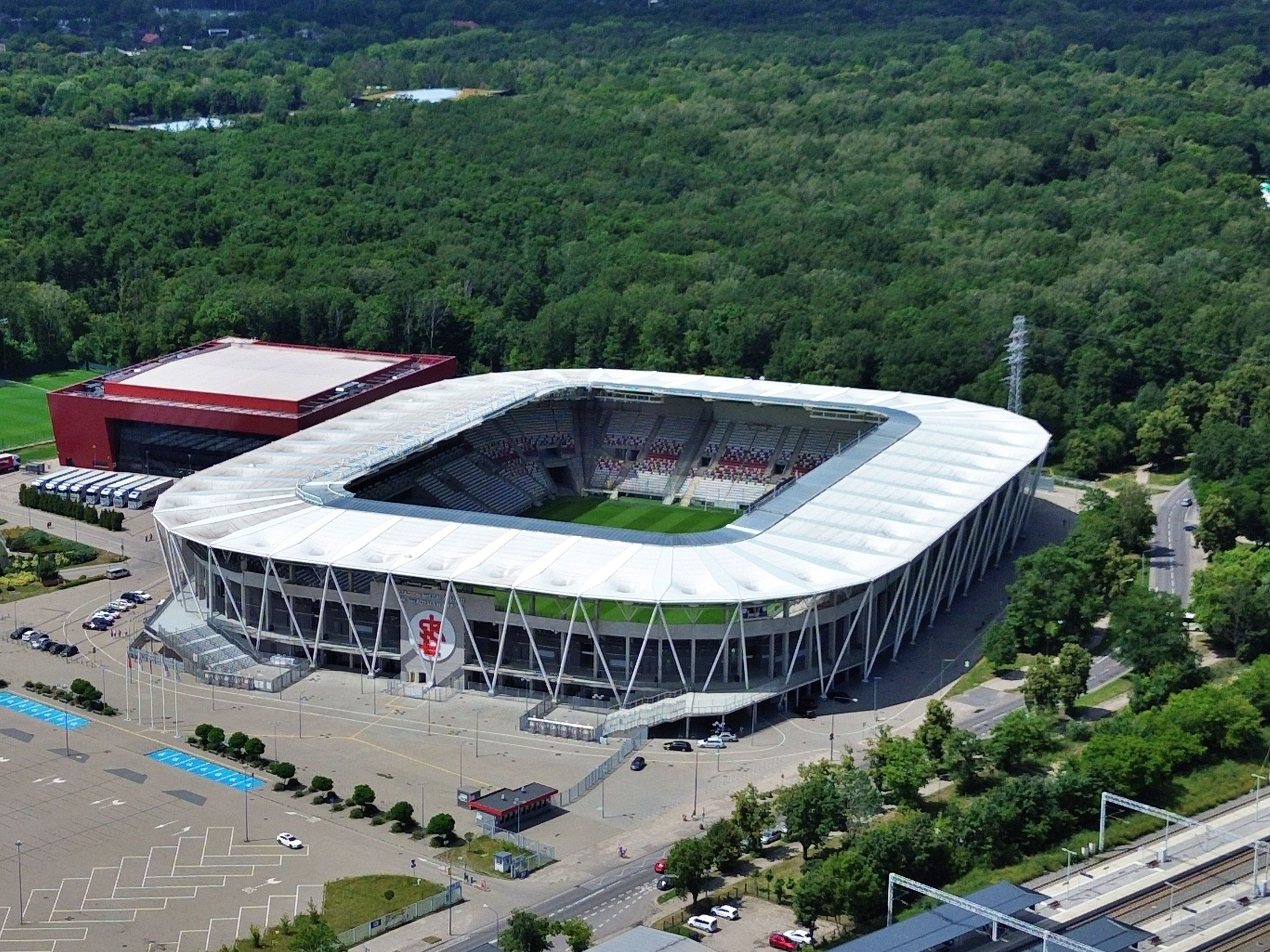
Władysław Król Municipal Stadium, home venue of ŁKS Łódź

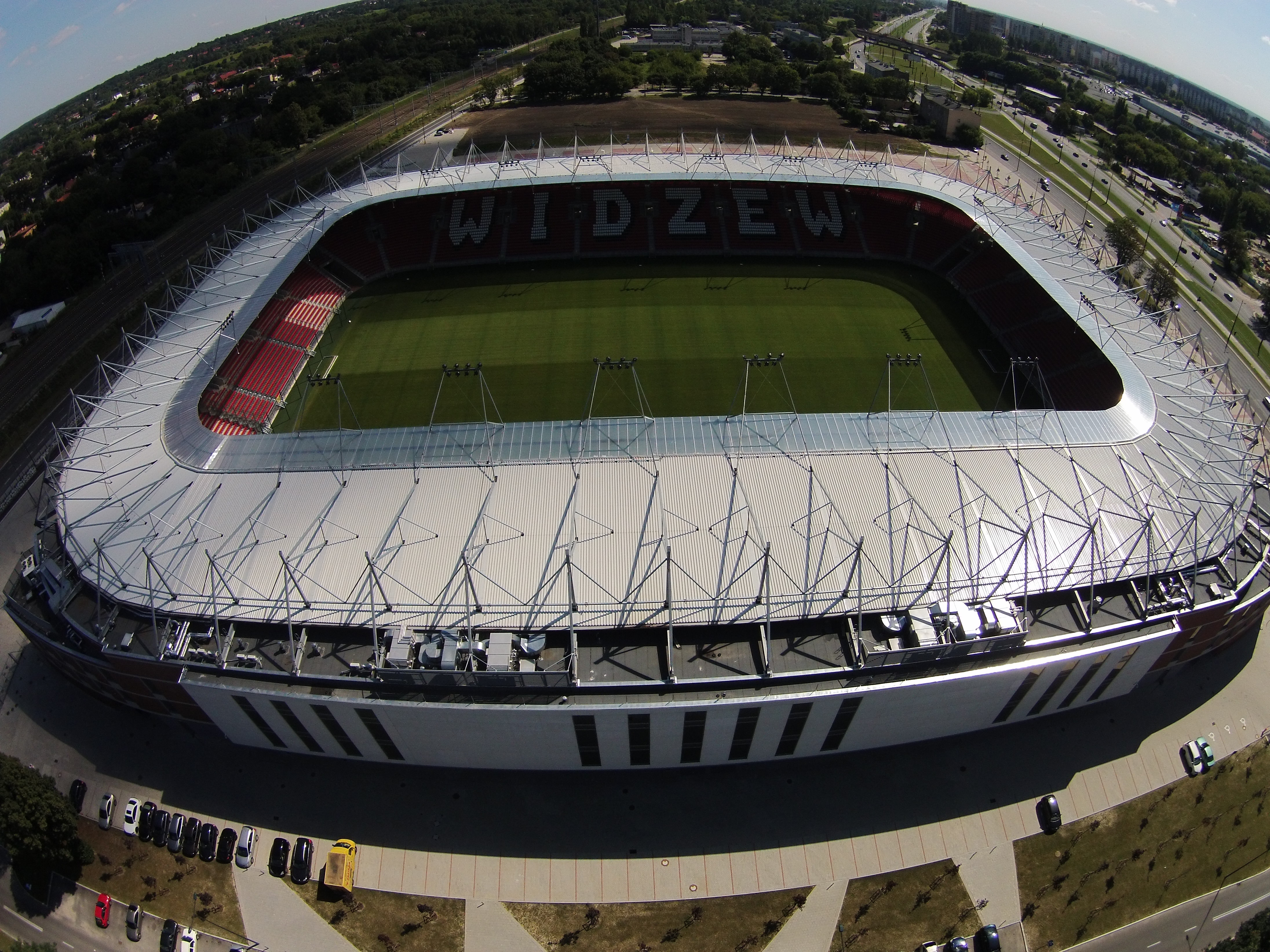
Widzew Łódź Stadium

The city has experience as a host for international sporting events such as the 2009 EuroBasket, the 2011 EuroBasket Women, the 2014 FIVB Volleyball Men's World Championship and the 2019 FIFA U-20 World Cup, with the opening and final of the latter taking place at Widzew Stadium. Łódź will also host the sixth edition of the European Universities Games in 2022.

Under communism it was common for clubs to participate in many different sports for all ages and sexes. Many of these traditional clubs still survive. Originally they were owned directly by a public body, but have become independently operated by clubs or private companies. However, they get public support through the cheap rent of land and other subsidies from the city. Some of their sections have gone professional and separated from the clubs as private companies. For example, Budowlani S.A is a private company that owns the only professional rugby team in Łódź, while Klub Sportowy Budowlani remains a community amateur club.

- Budowlani Łódź – rugby (six times Polish champions), hockey, wrestling, volleyball
- ŁKS Łódź – association football (two times Polish champions), basketball (Polish champions 1953), volleyball (two times Polish champions), handball, boxing
- SMS Łódź – association football, volleyball, basketball
- KS Społem Łódź – road and track cycling
- SKS Start Łódź – football, swimming
- Widzew Łódź – association football (four time Polish champions, semi-finalists of the 1982–83 European Cup)
- Orzeł Łódź - motorcycle speedway team
- Sroki Łódź - Rugby league (three times Polish champions)

In Ekstraklasa of Polish beach soccer Łódź have three professional clubs: Grembach, KP and BSCC.

=== Horticultural Expo 2029 ===
Łódź bid for the Specialized Expo 2022/2023 but lost out to Buenos Aires, Argentina.

Łódź was planned to host the Horticultural Expo in 2024. However, multiple Expo events were delayed due to the COVID-19 pandemic, a Horticultural Expo in Doha, Qatar from 2021/22 to 23/24 among them. As a result, the Horticultural Expo in Łódź has been rescheduled to 2029 to maintain a required time interval between them.

== Notable residents ==
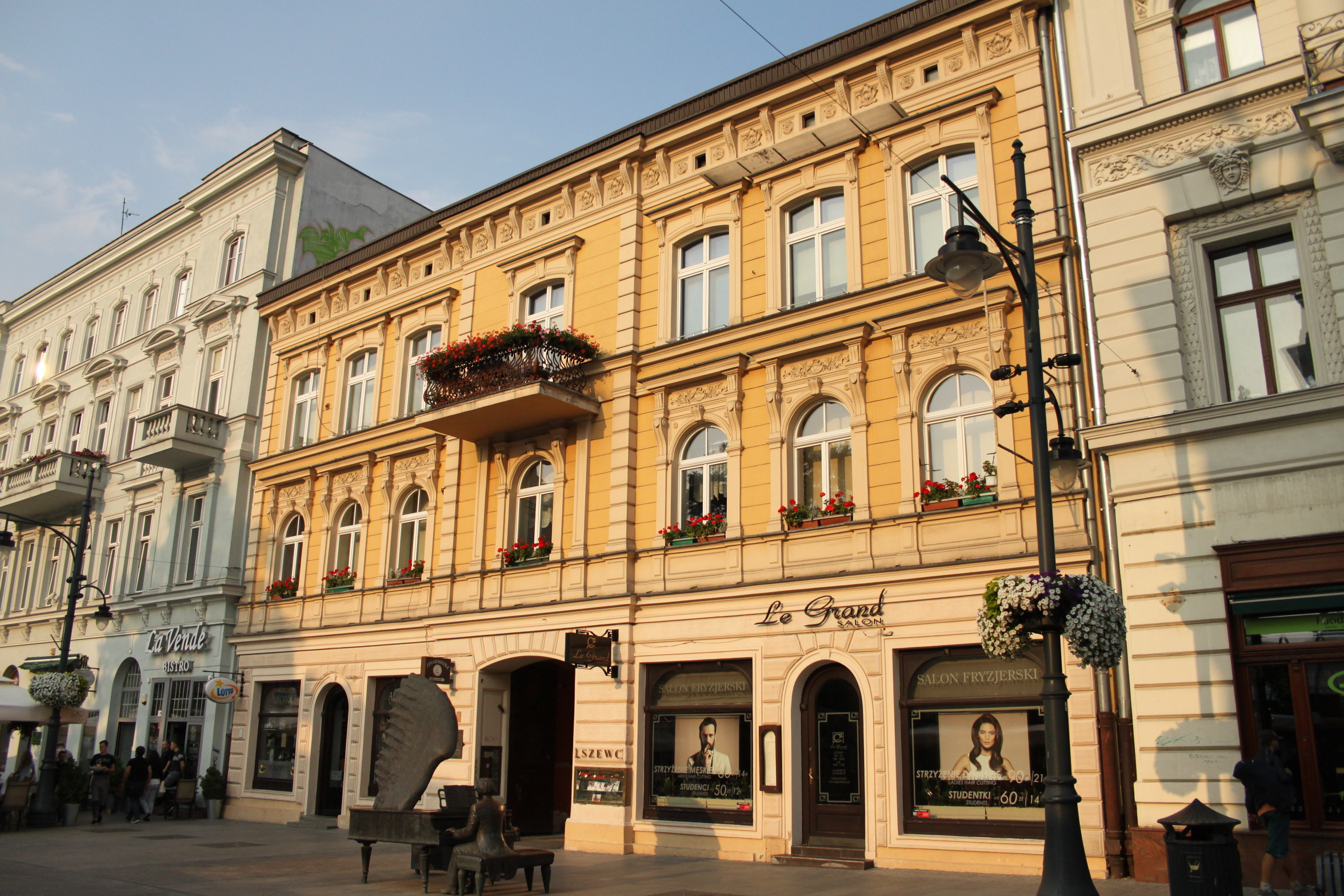
Sculpture of Artur Rubinstein and his childhood home at Piotrkowska Street

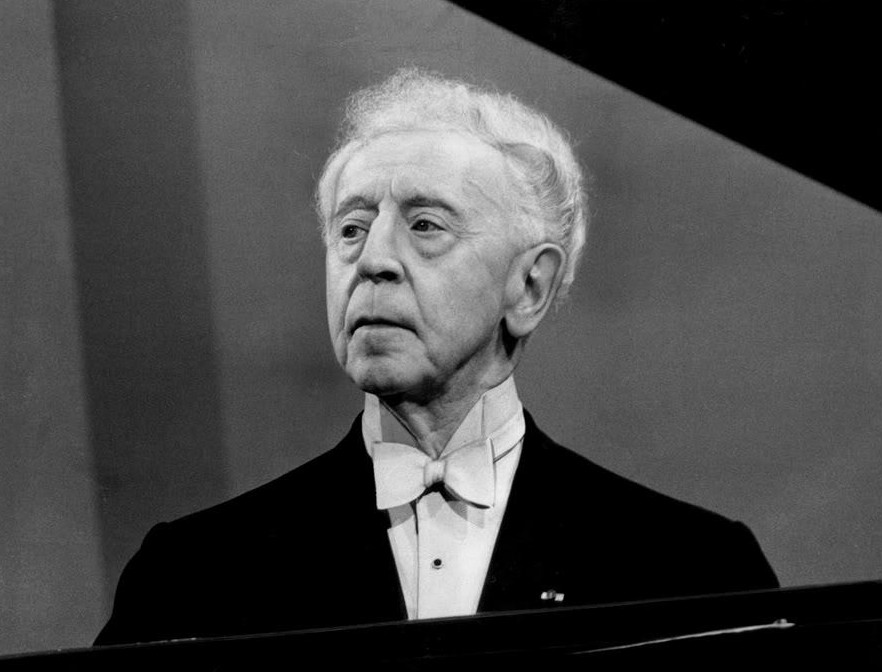
Arthur Rubinstein, one of the greatest pianists of the 20th century, was born in Łódź

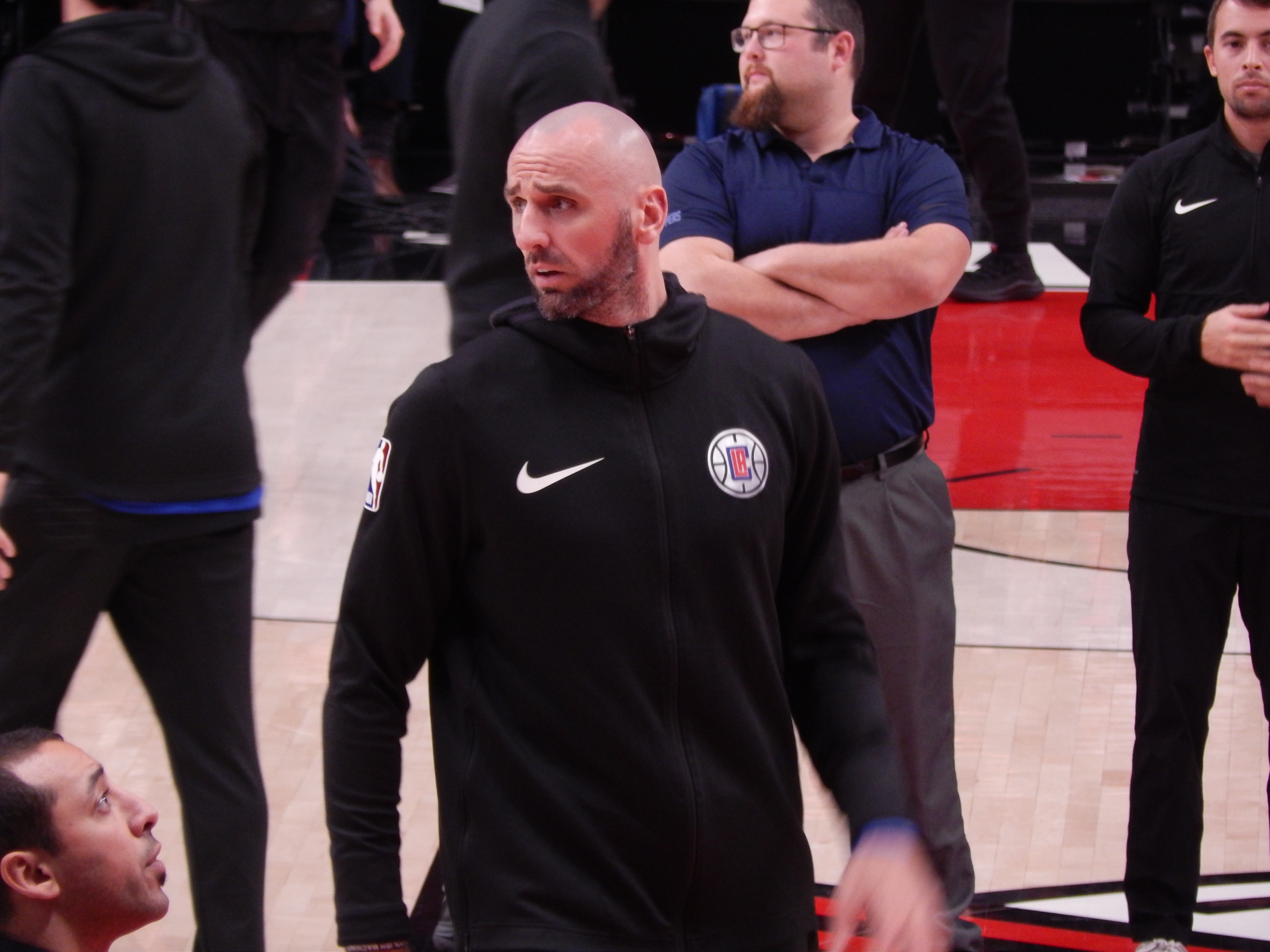
Marcin Gortat, former NBA player

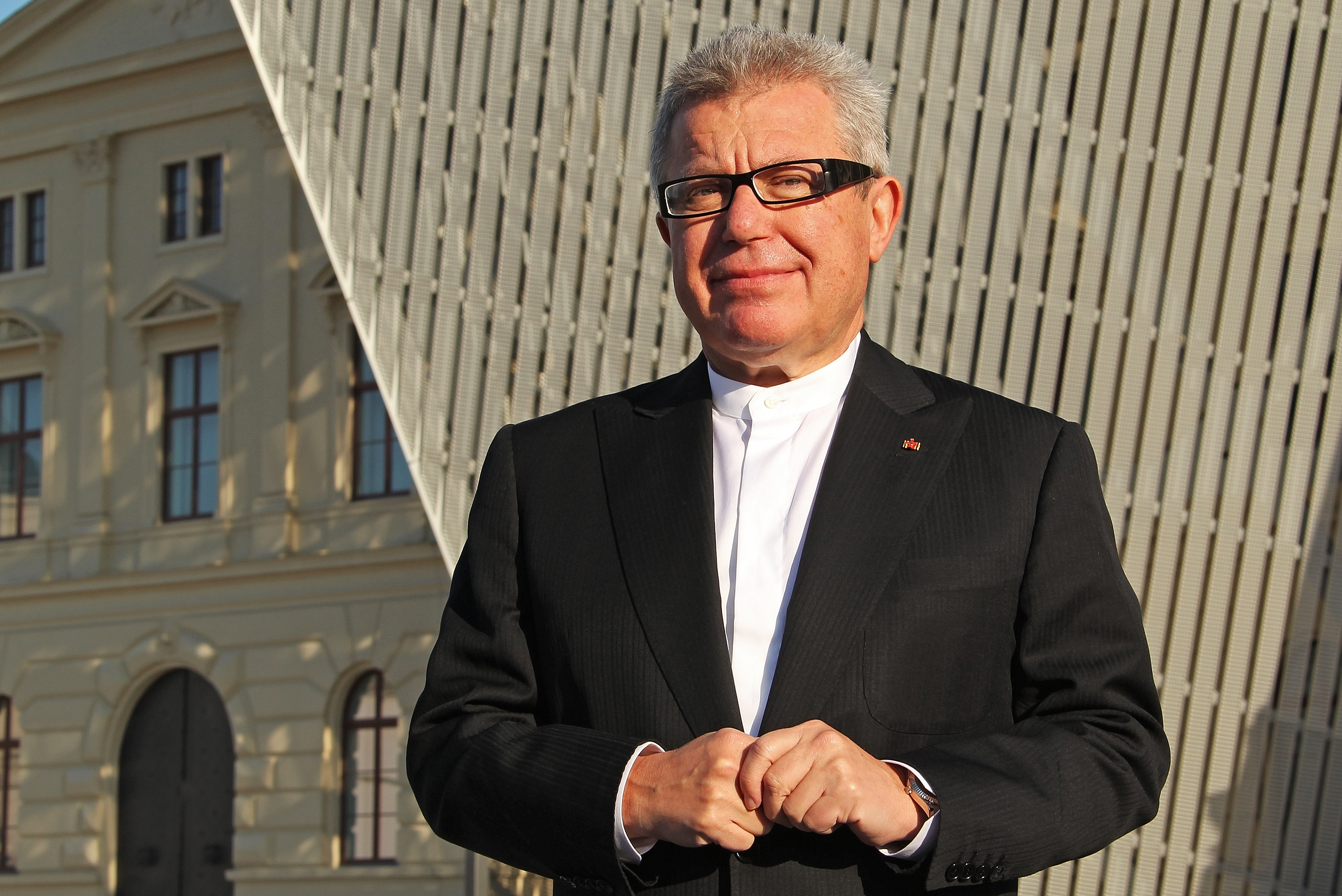
Daniel Libeskind, notable architect and designer

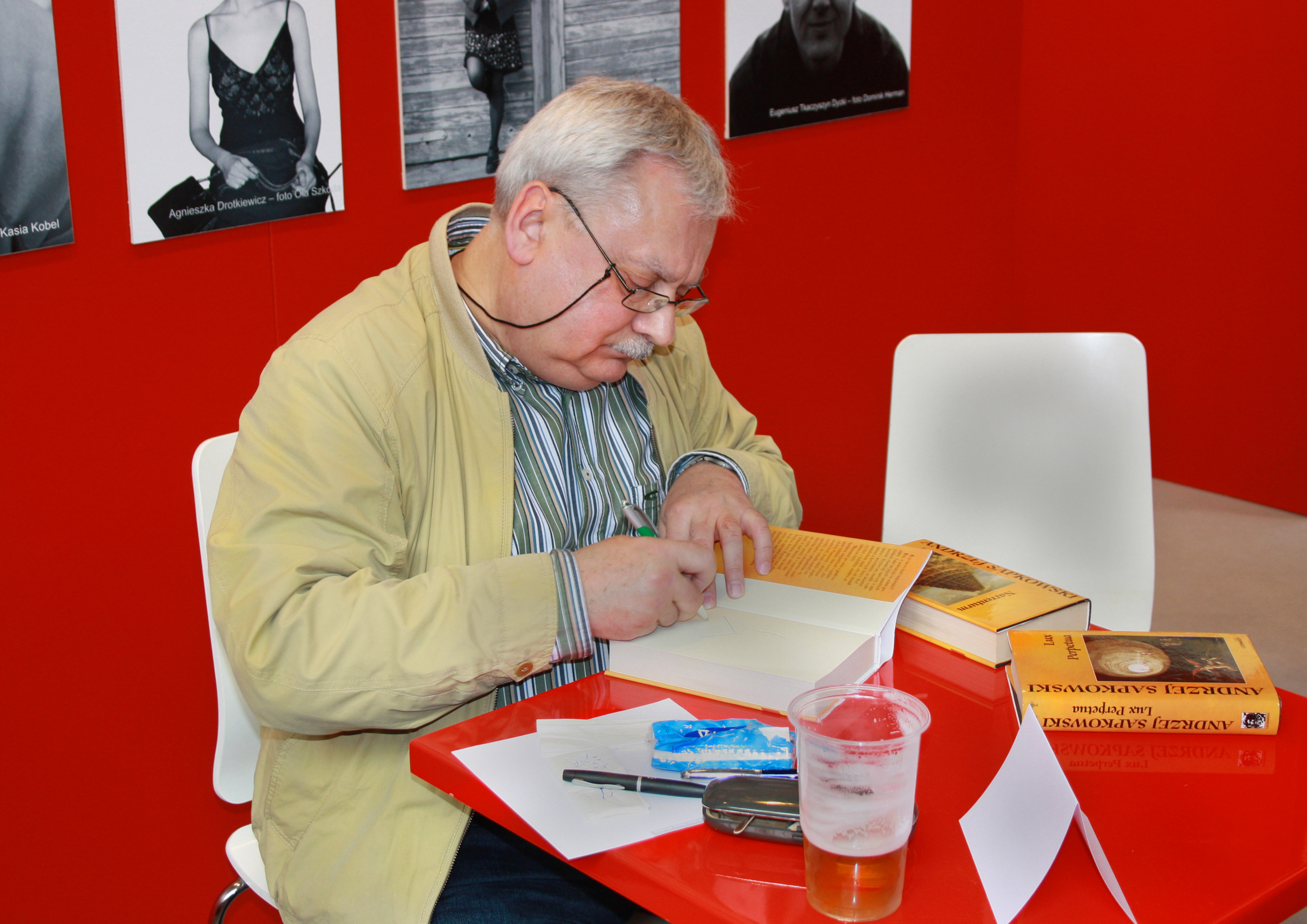
Andrzej Sapkowski, best known for The Witcher book series

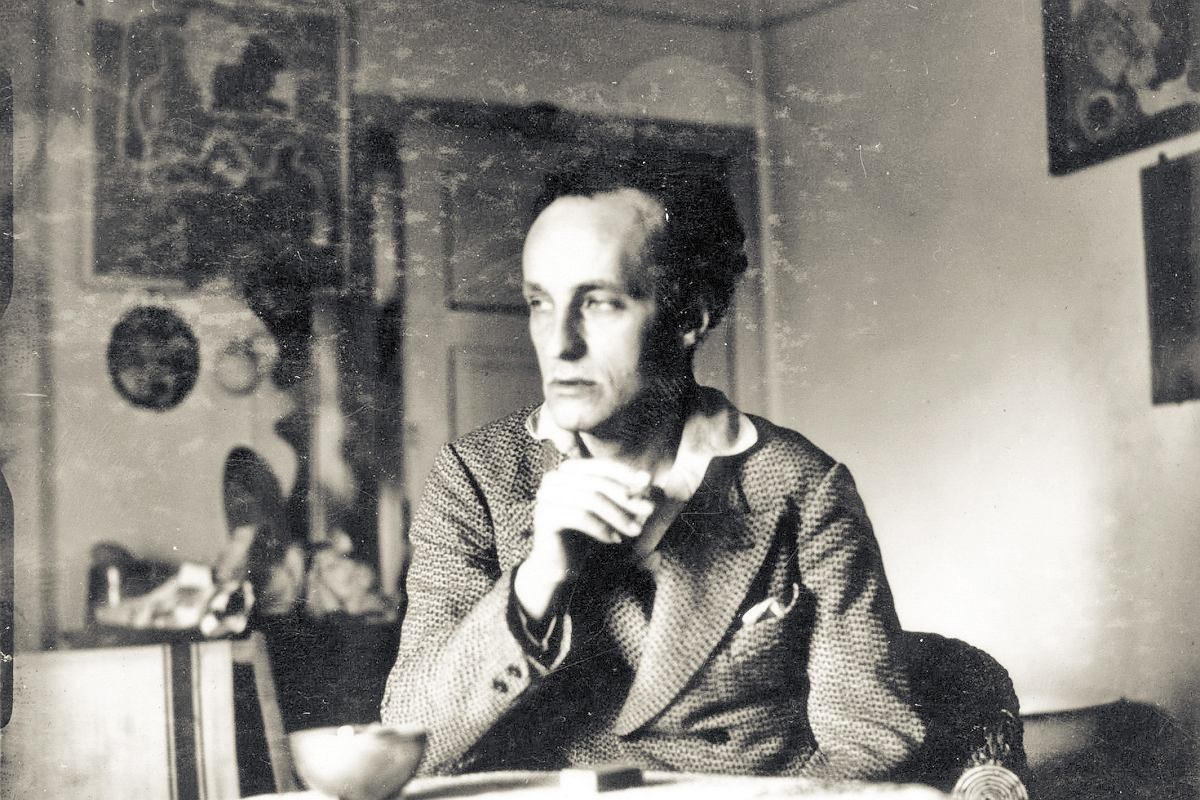
Władysław Strzemiński, painter

- Daniel Amit (1938–2007), Israeli physicist
- Yehuda Ashlag (1885–1954), rabbi
- Grażyna Bacewicz (1909–1969), composer
- Aleksander Bardini (1913–1995), theatre director and actor
- Andrzej Bartkowiak (born 1950), cameraman and film director
- Jurek Becker (1937–1997), writer
- Sylwester Bednarek (born 1989), high jumper
- Marek Belka (born 1952), politician, former Prime Minister
- Karolina Bielawska (born 1999), model and Miss World 2021
- Kazimierz Brandys (1916–2000), writer
- Artur Brauner (1918–2019), film producer
- Edward G. Brisch (1901–1960), industrial coding and classification expert
- Jacob Bronowski (1908–1974), writer, mathematician and Britain's leading academic TV figure of the 1970s
- Włada Bytomska (1904-1938), interwar activist
- Sabina Citron (1928–2023), Holocaust survivor, activist and author
- Bat-Sheva Dagan (1925–2024), Holocaust survivor, teacher, psychologist and author
- Karl Dedecius (1921–2016), translator
- Elizabeth Diller (born 1954), American architect
- Marek Edelman (1919/1922–2009), politician, human rights activist and Holocaust survivor
- Jacob Eisner (born 1947), Israeli basketball player
- Max Factor Sr. (1877–1938), businessman, founder of the Max Factor cosmetics company
- Magdalena Fręch (born 1997), tennis player
- Dov Freiberg (1927–2008), Holocaust survivor and writer
- Joseph Friedenson (1922–2013), Holocaust survivor and writer
- Piotr Fronczewski (born 1946), Polish actor
- Maciej Golubiewski (born 1976), Polish political scientist and diplomat, Consul General of the Republic of Poland in New York City
- Marcin Gortat (born 1984), basketball player
- Mendel Grossman (1913–1945), Łódź ghetto photographer
- Józef Hecht (1891–1951), engraver and printmaker
- Witold Hurewicz (1904–1956), mathematician
- Jerzy Janowicz (born 1990), tennis player
- Josef Joffe (born 1944), journalist
- Michał Kalecki (1899–1970), Marxian economist
- Roman Kantor (1912–1943), épée fencer
- Jan Karski (1914–2000), diplomat and anti-nazi resistant
- Aharon Katzir (1914–1972), Israeli pioneer in study of electrochemistry of biopolymers; killed in Lod Airport Massacre
- Paul Kletzki (1900–1973), conductor
- Zenon Kliszko (1908-1989), politician
- Katarzyna Kobro (1898–1951), sculptor
- Lea Koenig (born 1929), Israeli actress
- Tomasz Konieczny (born 1972), opera singer
- Jerzy Kosinski (1933–1991), writer
- Jan Kowalewski (1892–1965), cryptologist
- Karolina Kowalkiewicz (born 1985), mixed martial artist
- Feliks W. Kres (1966–2022), fantasy writer
- Anna Lewandowska (born 1988), karateka and nutrition expert
- Nathan Lewin (born 1936), Washington, D.C. attorney
- Daniel Libeskind (born 1946), architect
- Eliezer Livneh (1902–1975), Zionist activist, journalist, publicist, and Israeli politician
- Mikołaj Marczyk (born 1995), rally driver
- Binyamin Mintz (1903– 1961), Israeli Minister of Postal Services
- Tadeusz Miciński (1873–1918), poet
- Izabella Miko (born 1981), actress
- Stanisław Mikulski (1929–2014), actor
- Ruth Minsky Sender (1926–2024), author and survivor
- Zew Wawa Morejno (1916–2011), Chief Rabbi
- Henry Morgentaler (1923–2013), physician
- Konstantin Petrovich Nechaev (1883–1946), White movement leader and mercenary commander in China
- Zbigniew Nienacki (1929–1994), writer
- Marek Olędzki (born 1951), archaeologist
- Marian P. Opala (1921–2010), Oklahoma Supreme Court Justice
- O.S.T.R. (born 1980), rapper
- Adam Palma (born 1974), Polish-British guitarist and teacher
- Aghvan Papikyan (born 1994), Polish-Armenian international football player
- Karol Pasiewicz (born 2006), racing driver
- Władysław Pasikowski (born 1959), film director
- Roman Polanski (born 1933), film director
- Piotr Pustelnik (born 1951), alpine and high-altitude climber, the 20th man to climb all 14 eight-thousanders
- Ze'ev Raban (born Wolf Rawicki; 1890–1970), Israeli painter and sculptor
- Adolph Moses Radin (1848–1909), rabbi
- Damian Radowicz (born 1989), footballer
- Władysław Reymont (1867–1925), writer, Nobel Prize winner
- Joseph Rotblat (1908–2005), physicist, Nobel Prize winner
- Stefan Rozental (1903–1994), nuclear physicist
- Arthur Rubinstein (1887–1982), pianist
- Arnold Rutkowski, opera singer
- Zbigniew Rybczyński (born 1949), animator
- Marek Saganowski (born 1978), footballer
- Andrzej Sapkowski (born 1948), fantasy writer
- Karl Wilhelm Scheibler (1820–1881), industrialist
- Ebi Smolarek (born 1981), footballer
- Piotr Sobociński (1958–2001), cinematographer
- Andrzej Sontag (born 1952), track-and-field athlete
- Natan Spigel (1900–1942), painter
- Władysław Strzemiński (1893–1952), painter
- Borys Szyc (born 1978), actor and musician
- Arthur Szyk (1894–1951), artist
- Adam Szymczyk (born 1970), art critic and curator
- Alexandre Tansman (1897–1986), composer and pianist
- Jack Tramiel (1928–2012), computer manufacturer, the founder of Commodore
- Julian Tuwim (1894–1953), poet
- Andrzej Udalski (born 1957), astronomer and astrophysicist
- Aleksandra Uznańska-Wiśniewska (born 1994), politician, political scientist, humanitarian
- Sławosz Uznański-Wiśniewski (born 1984), engineer and astronaut of the European Space Agency
- Avraham Verdiger (1921–2013), Israeli politician
- Istvan Vizvary, Polish science fiction writer
- Michał Wiśniewski (born 1972), singer
- Paweł Zatorski (born 1990), volleyball player
- Hanna Zdanowska (born 1959), politician, Mayor of Łódź
- Aleksandra Ziółkowska-Boehm (born 1949), writer

== International relations ==
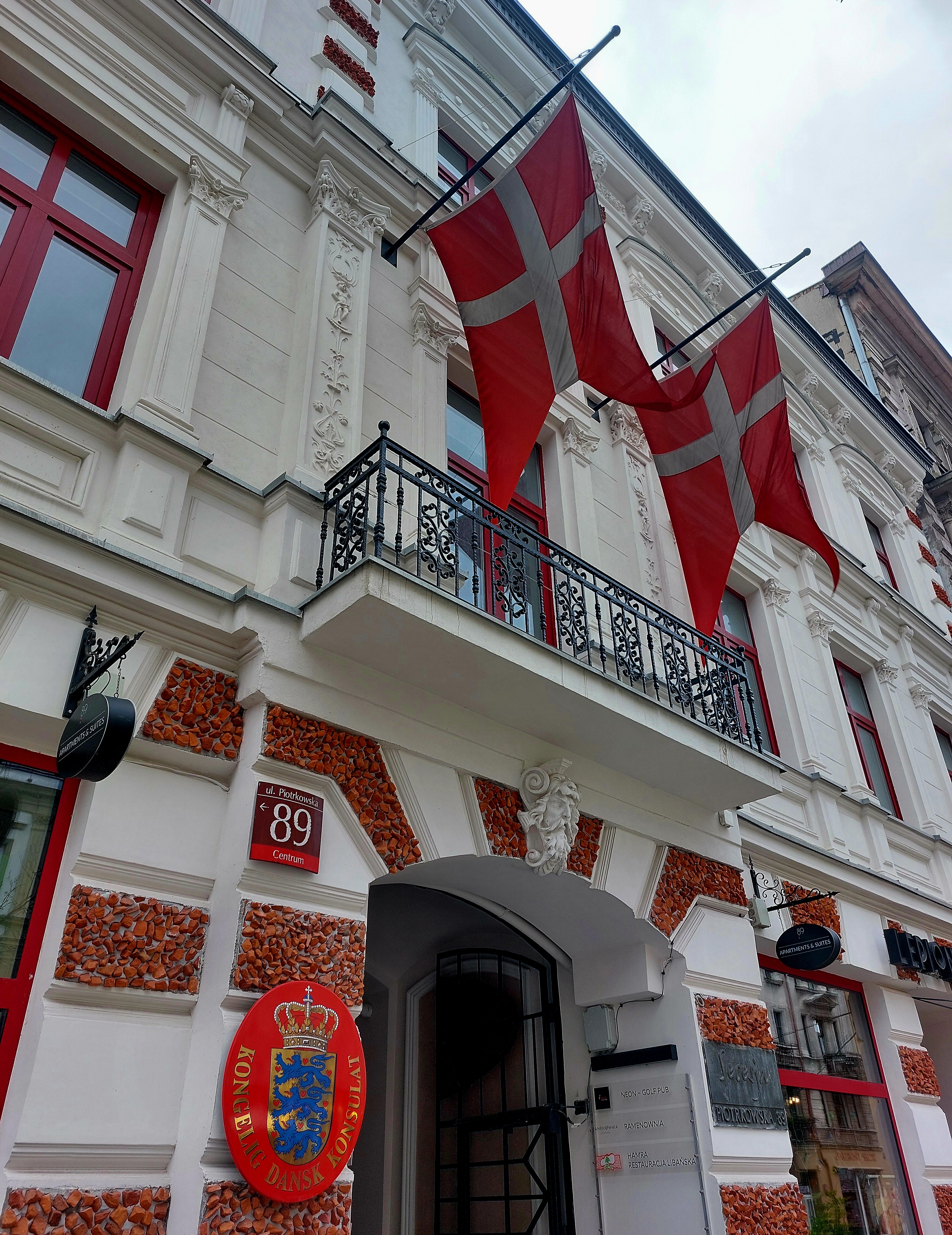
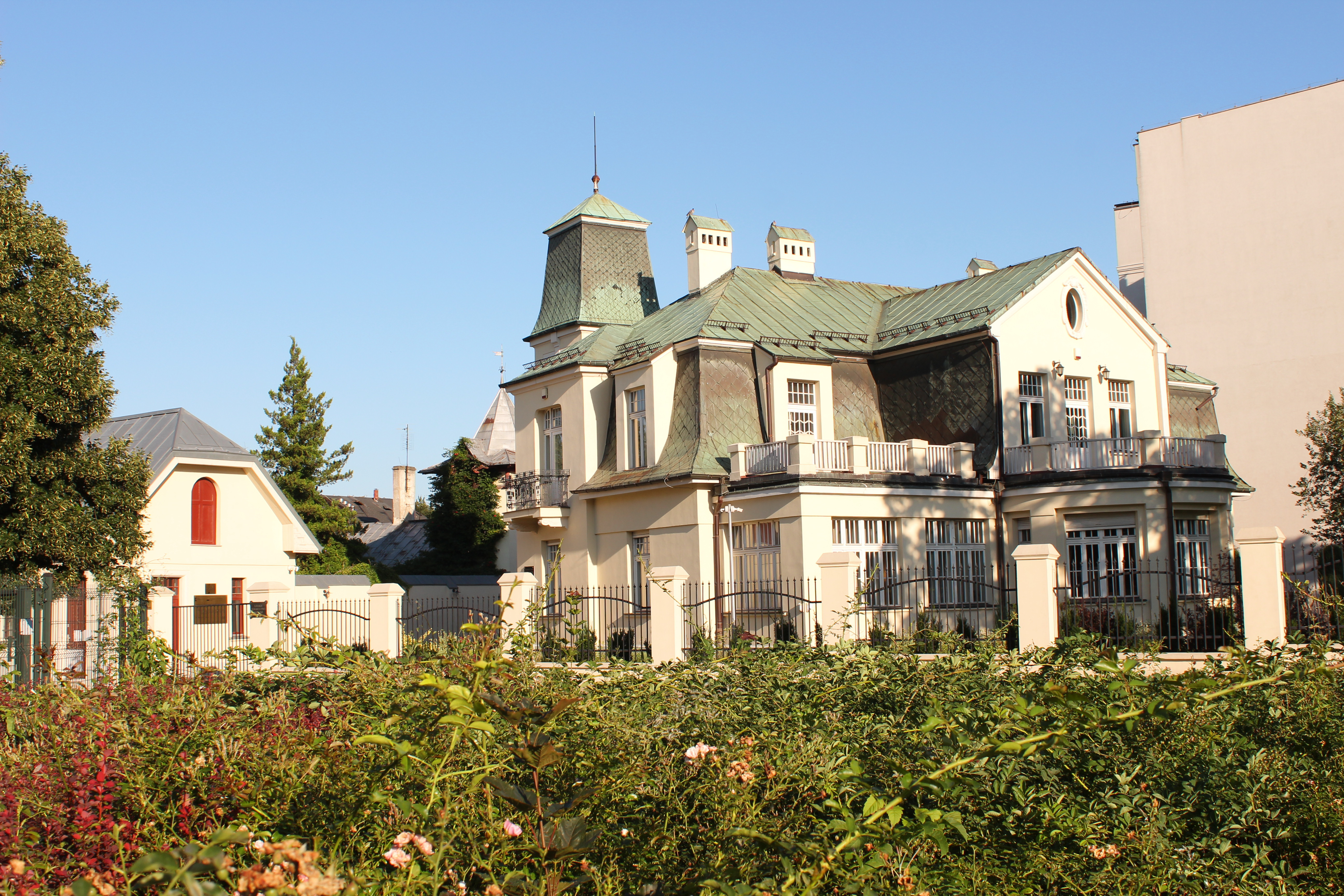
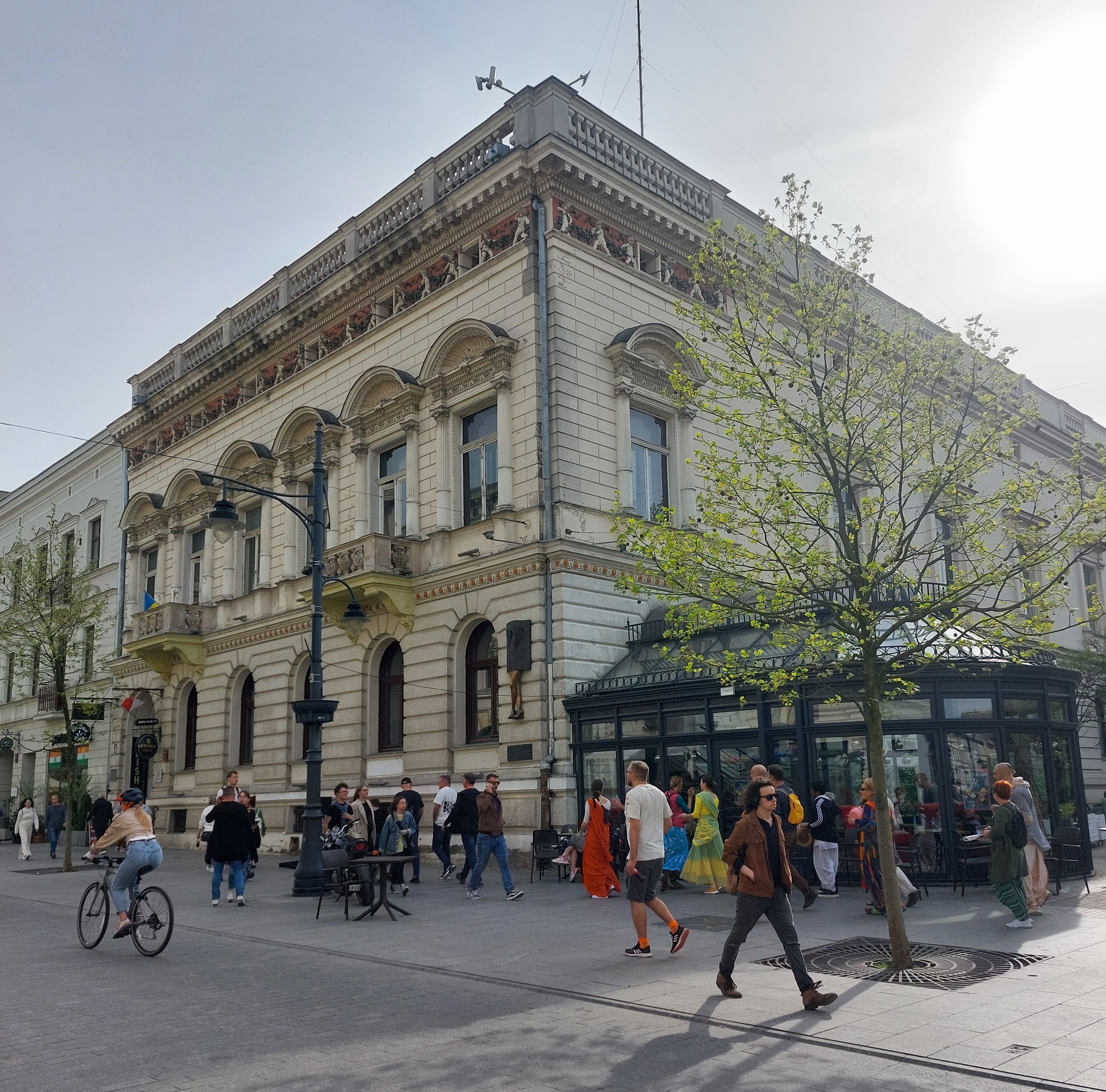
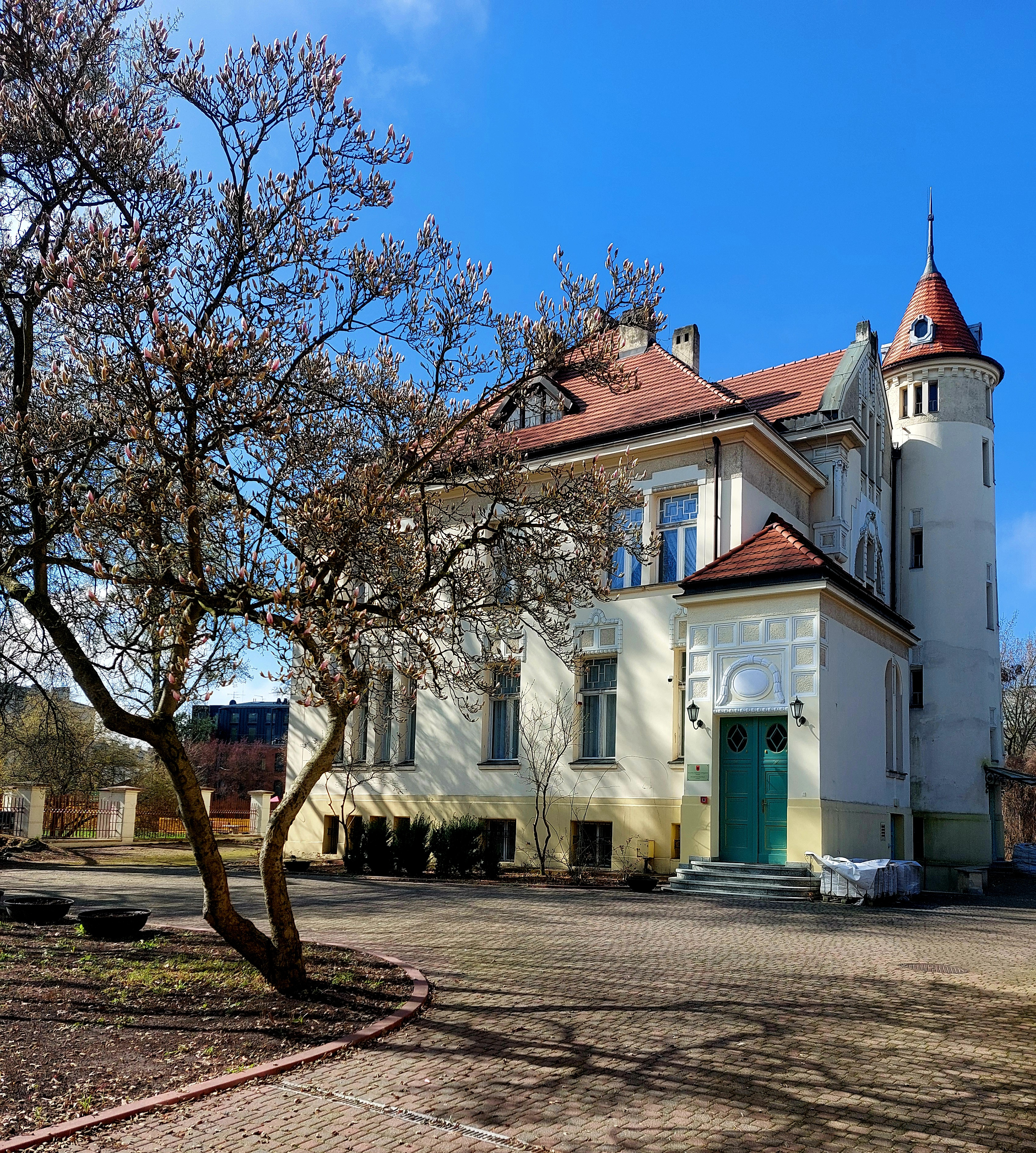
From top, left to right: honorary consulates of Denmark, Czechia, Ukraine and Albania

Łódź is home to fourteen foreign consulates, i.e. honorary consulates general of Hungary and Turkey, and honorary consulates of Albania, Armenia, Austria, Democratic Republic of the Congo, Czech Republic, Denmark, France, Lithuania, Luxembourg, Malta, Moldova and Ukraine.

=== Twin towns – sister cities ===
Łódź is twinned with:

- Chemnitz, Germany (since 1972)
- Stuttgart, Germany (since 1988)
- Lyon, France (since 1991)
- Vilnius, Lithuania (since 1991)
- Odesa, Ukraine (since 1993)
- Tianjin, China (since 1993)
- Tel Aviv, Israel (since 1994)
- (Georgia (country)) Rustavi, Georgia (since 1995)
- Barreiro, Portugal (since 1996)
- Tampere, Finland (since 1996)
- Puebla, Mexico (since 1996)
- Murcia, Spain (since 1999)
- Lviv, Ukraine (since 2003)
- Szeged, Hungary (since 2008)
- Guangzhou, China (since 2014)
- Chengdu, China (since 2015)
- Tainan, Taiwan (since 2025)

Łódź belongs also to the Eurocities network.

After the Russian invasion of Ukraine, Łódź terminated the partnership with Russian cities Ivanovo and Kaliningrad, and with Minsk, the capital of Belarus on 2 March 2022.

== See also ==
- History of Łódź
- Łódź Design Festival
- International Festival of Comics and Games in Łódź
- Bednarska Street, Łódź
- Karol Anstadt Avenue, Łódź
- Helenów Park in Łódź
- Fabrykant Oak
- Lecznicza Street
