= Museum of Paper Making and Printing, Łódź =

Polish museum

Museum of Paper Making and Printing
- Muzeum Papieru i Druku w Łodzi
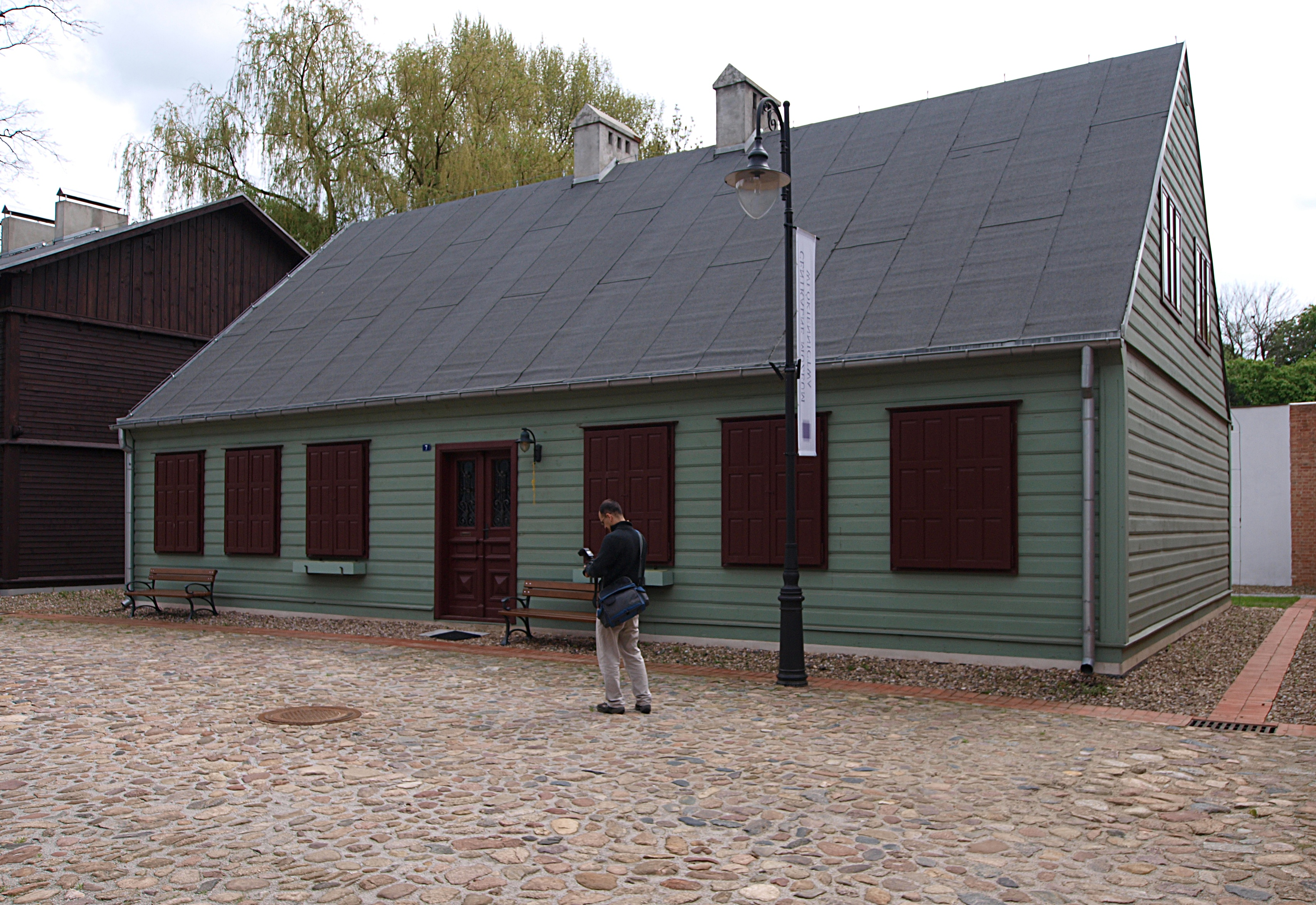
- ‘Paper Maker’s House’ (282 Piotrkowska Street)

- Location within Poland
- Location: Piotrkowska Street 282, Łódź, Poland
- Coordinates: 51.745778°N 19.463972°E
- Website: http://papiernictwohistoryczne.pl/muzeum/

The Museum of Paper Making and Printing (Polish: Muzeum Papieru i Druku w Łodzi) in Łódź is located in the area of the Institute of Paper Making and Printing at Lodz University of Technology.

== History of the museum ==
The museum was created in 2005 on the grounds of historical publishing and paper making workshops. Nowadays, the museum is managed by the Ocalić od Zapomnienia (Save from Forgetting) foundation. The charity collects exhibits in the field of paper making, printing and bookbinding history.

Among the museum pieces, there can be found such exhibits as a shearing paper cutter, tools for punching, a bathtub for paper making or metal as well as timber sorts of typesetting and a type-setter cabinet. Besides, visitors have a chance to see a collection of book bindings, ex libris, and woodcuts by Zygfryd Gardzielski as well as the whole book production cycle. The collection was created on the basis of Ryszrd Uljanski's collections.

In its current localization, the museum has existed since 19 November 2007.

In the ‘Paper Maker’s House’ (building no 7), which is located in the area of the Łódź Wooden Architecture Skansen, there are two workshops established: a workshop of paper making and typography.
