= OFF Piotrkowska =

Mixed-use development

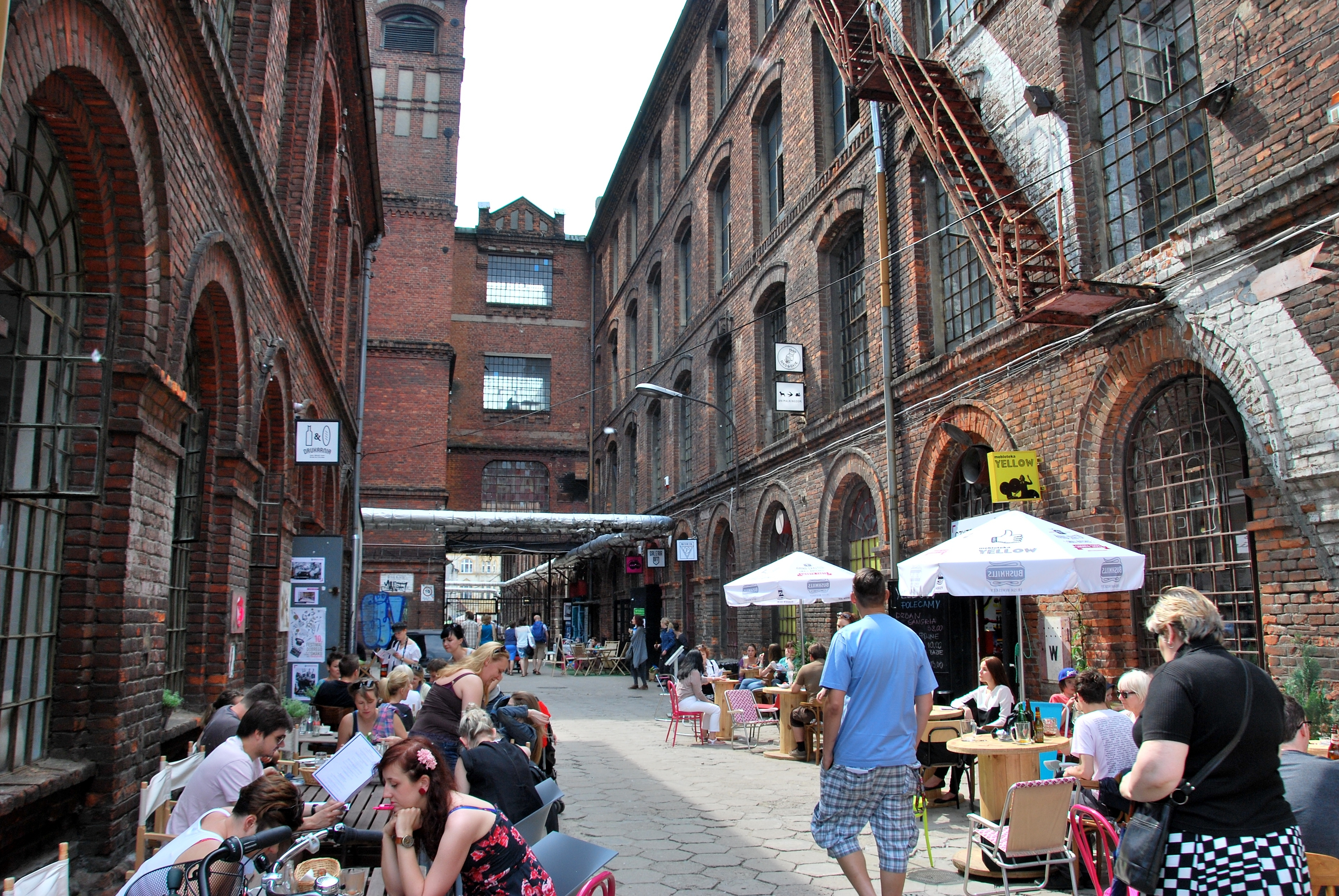

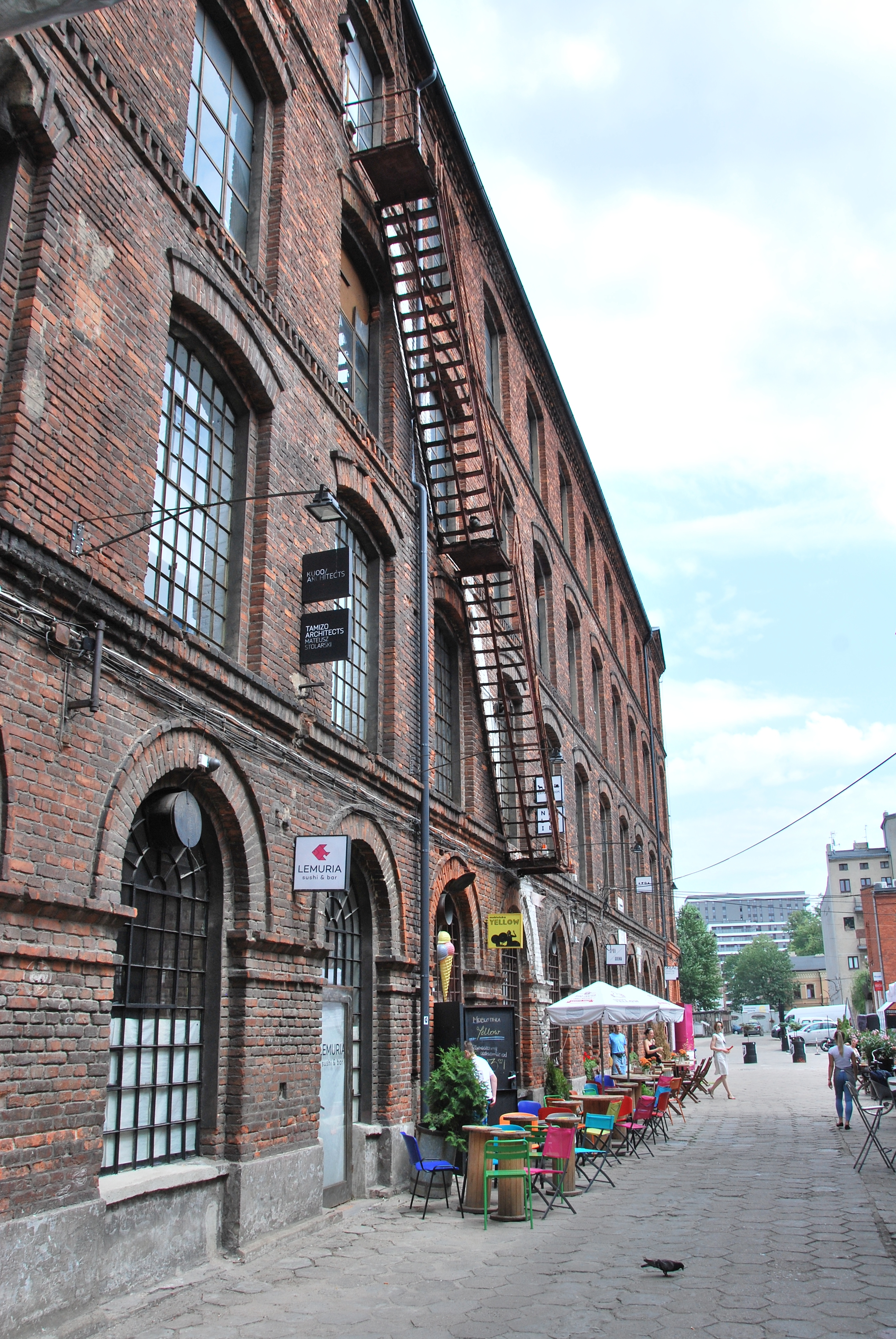

Off Piotrkowska is alternative mixed-use development situated in the former Ramisch factory at 138–140 Piotrkowska Street in Łódź, Poland, which operated as a cotton mill until 1990. Food trucks, bars, clubs, alternative music venues, studios, design companies and publishing houses occupy the buildings and open spaces. The usable area is 6,537 sqm and the plot area is 12,898 sqm.
