= Harnam Folk Dance Ensemble =

Dance ensemble from Poland

- Zespół Tańca Ludowego "Harnam"
- Formation: 1947
- Type: Ensemble
- Purpose: Folk
- Location: Łódź, Poland
- Artistic director: Krzysztof Sitkowski
- Award: Silver Medal for Merit to Culture – Gloria Artis (Poland, 2012) Labor Order (Vietnam, 1963) Order of the Banner of Work 1st Class (Poland, 1967) Order of the Banner of Work 2nd Class (Poland, 1955)
- Website: harnam.pl

The Harnam Folk Dance Ensemble (alternatively The Representative Ensemble of The Łódź Voivodeship; in Polish: Zespół Tańca Ludowego "Harnam") is the oldest folk ensemble in Poland. It was established in 1947 by Jadwiga Hryniewiecka. Harnam meets in the Ludwik Geyer’s White Factory in Łódź.

== History ==
Harnam was originally established by the Szymon Harnam Textile Industrial Works No. 8 in Łódź. Its first artistic director was Jadwiga Hryniewiecka and then her students: Sławomir Mazurkiewicz (1979-1990) and Maria Kryńska (1990-2008). In 1994 Kryńska and Krzysztof Sitkowski founded a therapy studio for children and teenagers with Down syndrome and they worked until 2008. In 2012 Harnam and Sitkowski were awarded the Silver Medal for Merit to Culture – Gloria Artis. Sitkowski (a student of Hryniewiecka’s) has been artistic director since 2012.

== Repertoire ==
=== The Folk Dance Ensemble "Harnam" ===
Folk Dance Ensemble Harnam shows authentic character of Polish folk dance adapted to principles of theatre. Dances are with stage dramatization.

=== OFF Harnam Group ===
The OFF HARNAM group has also been working since 2008. It combines folk motifs, legends and basic steps with modern dance. It is the first group which represents the style of Folk Jazz – a combination of Polish folk dance with Jazz dance.

== Tournées ==
- Algeria ('75, '85),
- United Kingdom ('68, '79, '97),
- Austria ('51, '62),
- Belgium ('62, '66, '73, '84, '88, '94, '95),
- China ('63, 2013, 2023),
- Croatia ('92),
- Czechoslovakia ('49, '84),
- Czech Republic (2005),
- Egypt ('88),
- Finland (2007),
- France ('75, '76, '77, '80, '83, '84, '85, '86, '91, '92, '94, '96, 2004, 2006),
- Spain ('78, '94, '96, '98, 2008, 2009),
- Netherlands ('83, '85),
- Yugoslavia ('82, '95),
- Canada ('69, '72),
- North Korea ('86),
- Luxembourg ('86),
- Latvia (2007),
- Morocco ('85, 2010),
- Mongolia ('63),
- Germany ('59, '78, '92, 2005, 2009),
- East Germany ('50, '51, '52, '53, '61, '62, '65, '73, '75, '77, '79, '87, '89),
- Portugal ('94),
- Romania ('53, '69, 2008, 2015),
- Syria ('87),
- Switzerland ('64),
- Sweden (2003),
- Tunisia ('74),
- Turkey ('98, 2000, 2002, 2003, 2005, 2012, 2014, 2025),
- United States ('69, '72),
- Hungary (2002, 2006),
- Vietnam ('63),
- Italy ('58, '61, '91, 2024),
- Soviet Union ('64, '77)

- Moldavian Soviet Socialist Republic ('74)
