= White Factory =

Complex of industrial buildings in Łódź, Poland

Coordinates: 51.745539°N 19.46232°E

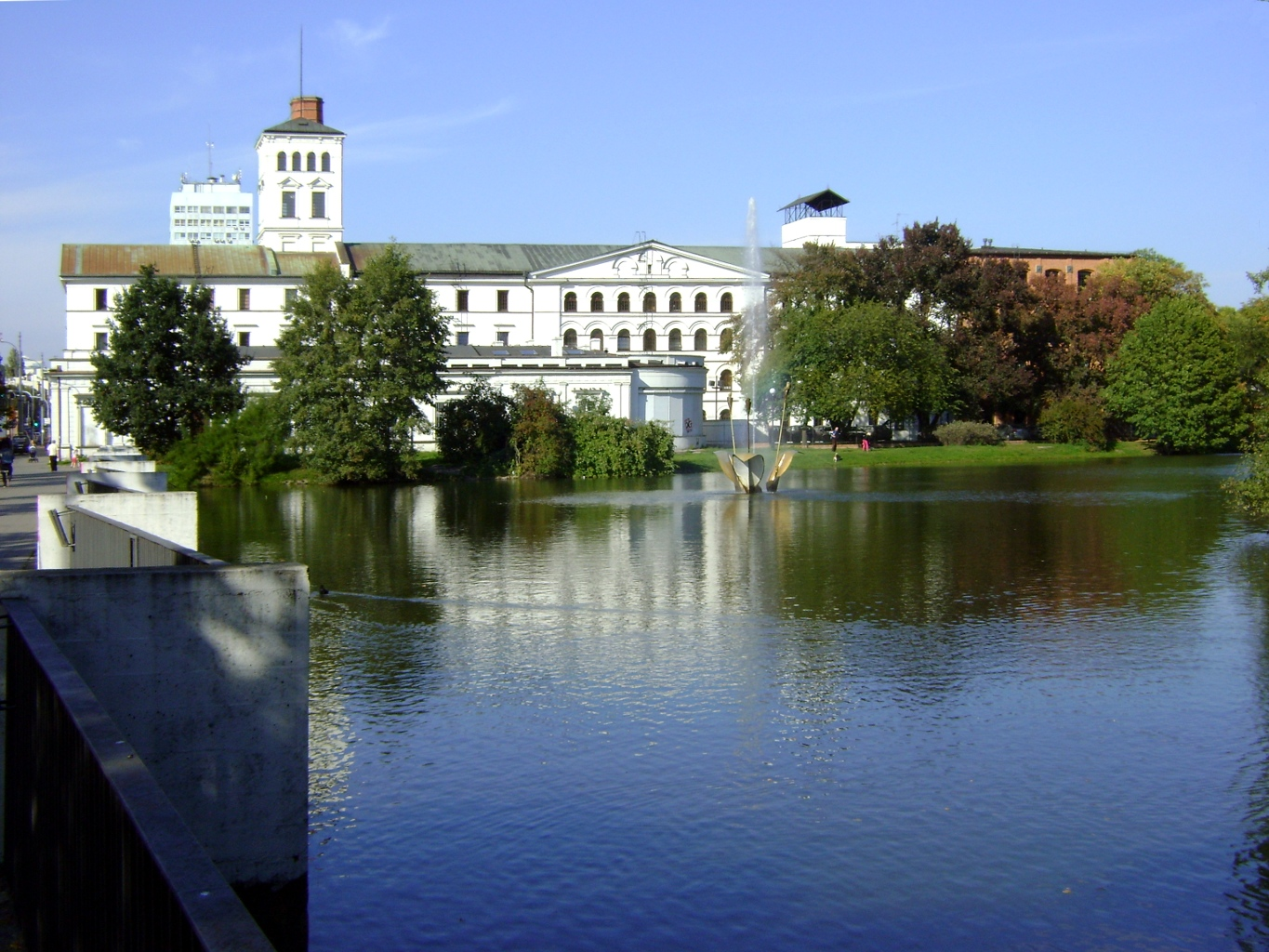
The factory complex from the southern side.

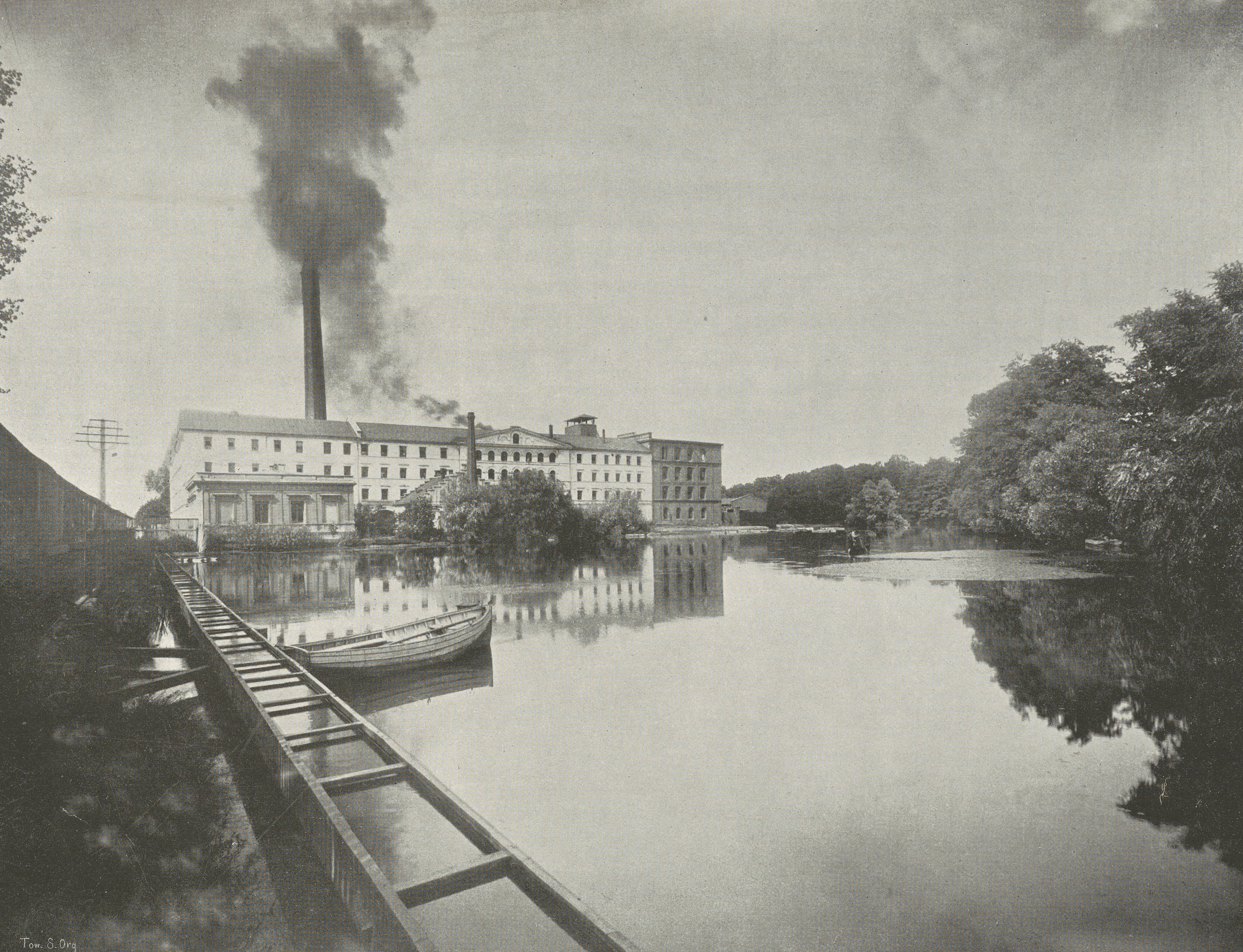
The factory (the 19th century)

The White Factory (Polish: Biała Fabryka) is a classicist building in Łódź, Poland, constructed in 1835–1839 as part of a textile factory complex belonging to Ludwik Geyer. It currently hosts the Central Museum of Textiles and the Harnam Folk Dance Ensemble. It is considered an example of early industrial architecture in Łódź.

== History ==
In the first half of the 19th century, Łódź, which was a part of the Congress Poland and previously a small town, experienced a rapid economic and industrial development. The city was open for migrants, and Geyer, a German originally from Saxony, moved to the city to start a textile manufacturing company. The building was reconstructed several times after the 1830s but still retains its original plan. The northern wing is from 1838, the southern one is from 1847, and the eastern wing was built in 1886.

In 1955, the building was chosen to be the home of the Central Museum of Textiles, and in 1958 reconstruction efforts started. The museum was established as an independent institution in 1960 while the rest of the building was still functional as a factory. Production in the eastern wing stopped in 1990, and the wing was transferred to the museum in the 2002, who now occupied the whole complex. On industrial grounds next to the White Factory, the Open Air Museum of Łódź Timber Architecture opened in 2009.

The building was classified as a cultural heritage monument. In 2023, the building was inscribed onto the European Route of Industrial Heritage.

== Description ==
The White Factory is a four-wing building with a courtyard, located at the southern end of Piotrkowska Street, south of the city center. The oldest wing is the western one, facing Piotrkowska Street. In the courtyard, the Old Boiler House is constructed. The complex has a high chimney, two dust towers, and two water towers, which is an unusual solution for the first half of the 19th century. South of the building, a pond is made.
