= Central Museum of Textiles, Łódź =

The Central Museum of Textiles
- Centralne Muzeum Włókiennictwa
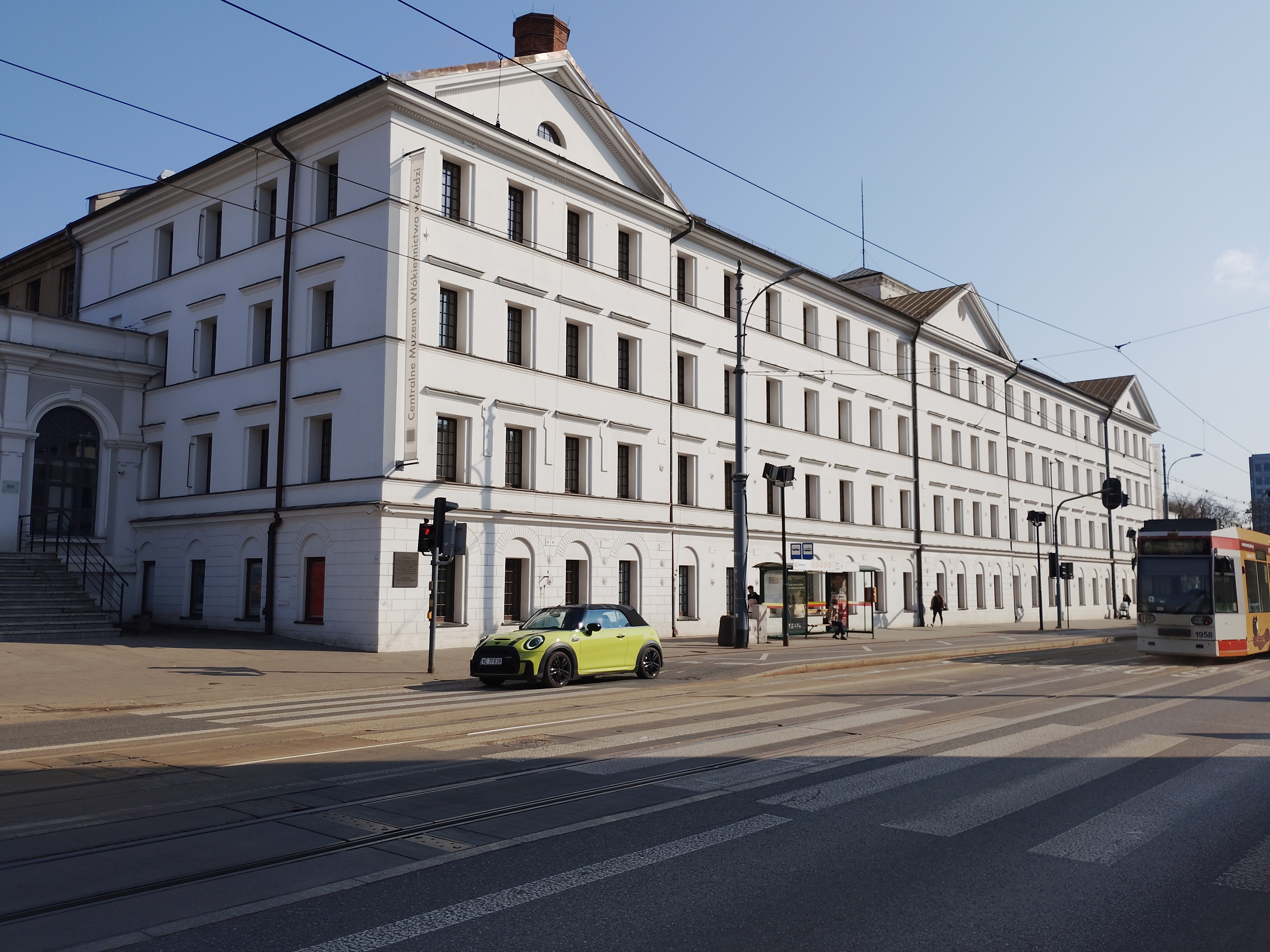
- (March 2026)

- Location within Poland
- Established: 1 January 1960
- Location: Piotrkowska Street 282, 93 – 034 Łódź, Poland
- Coordinates: 51.74521°N 19.46164°E
- Type: Textile art, history and technique museum
- Collection size: 200 000
- Director: Aneta Dalbiak
- Website: http://www.muzeumwlokiennictwa.pl/?lang=en

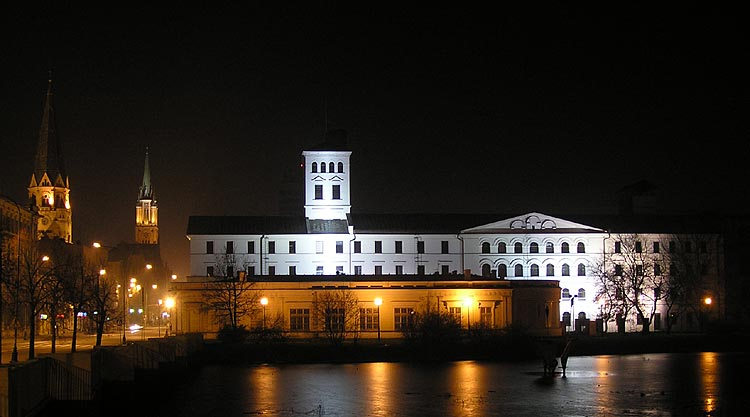
The Central Museum of Textiles in Łódź.

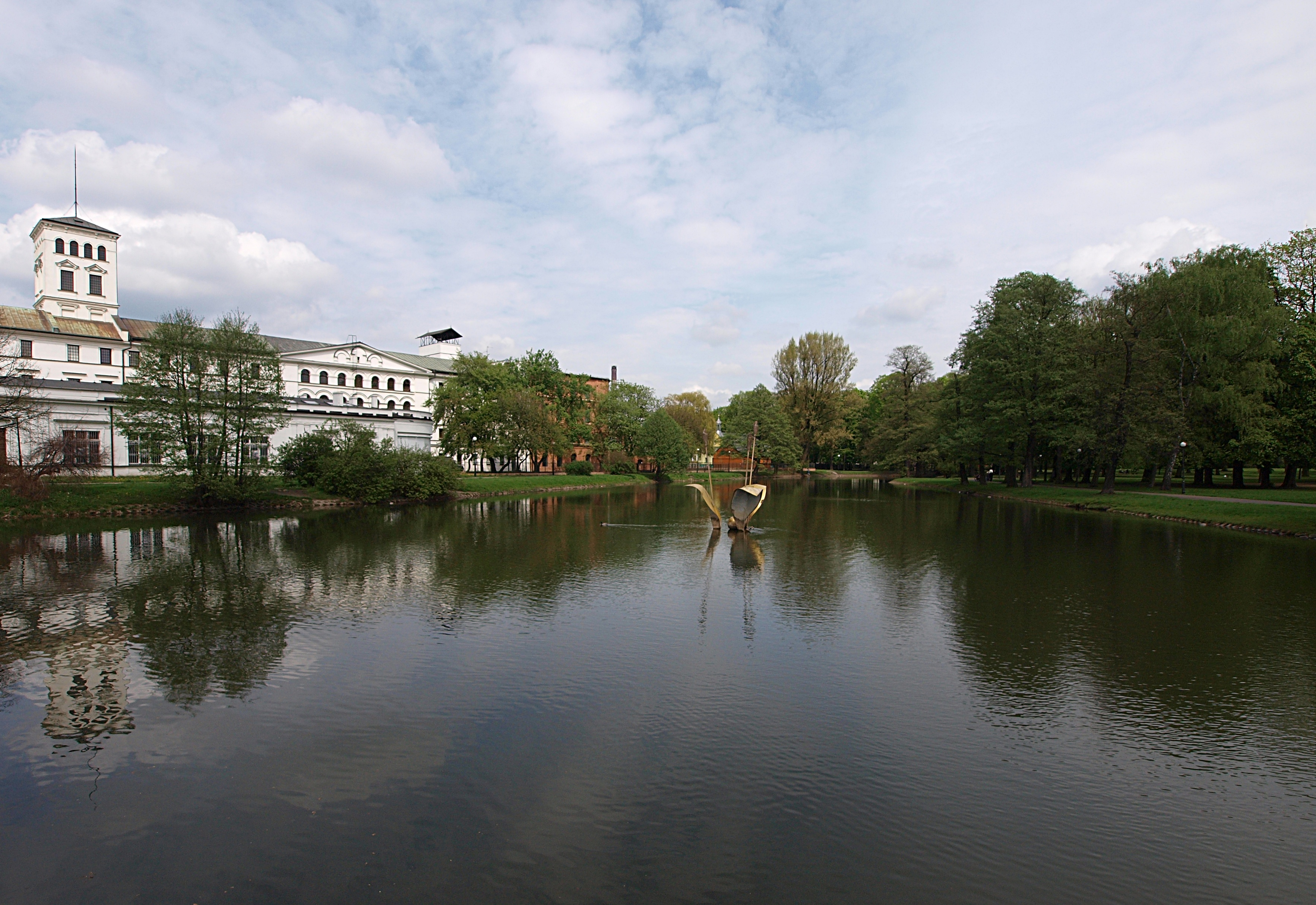
The Central Museum of Textiles and Władysław Reymont Park.

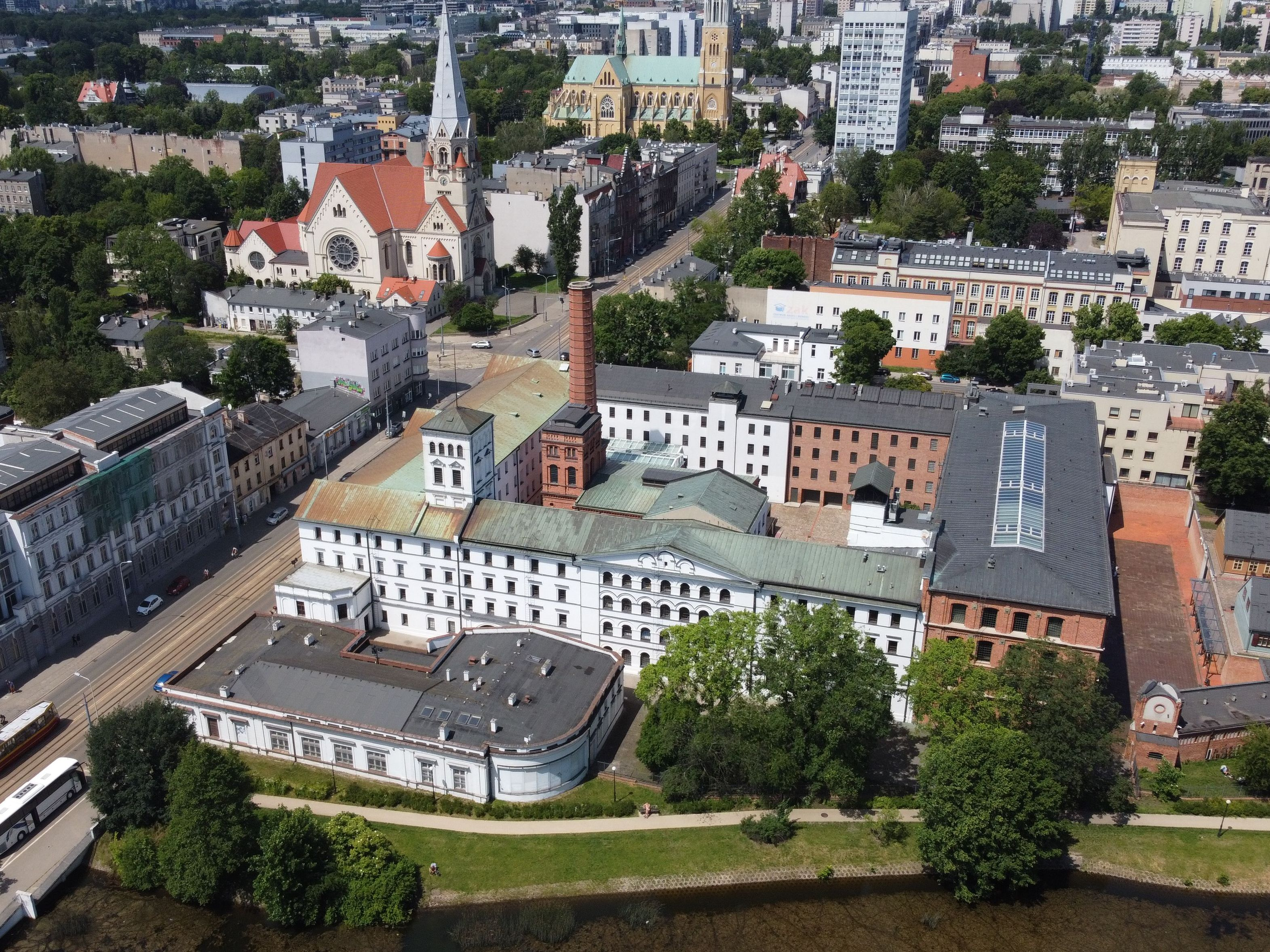
The Central Museum of Textiles in Łódź, aerial view (June, 2022).

The Central Museum of Textiles is a museum of textiles located in the Ludwik Geyer's White Factory in Łódź, Poland.

It is the first textile museum in the world and it has the biggest textile collection in Europe.

== History ==
First attempts to create an organized collection of textiles in the area date back to 1952, when Krystyna Kondratiuk led to establishing a Weaving Department in the Museum of Art in Łódź. Owing to the success of this enterprise, the department was transformed into a branch of the Museum of Art.

As an independent organizational unit, the museum has functioned since 1960, when the Museum of the History of Textiles was established. It was renamed to the Central Museum of Textiles in 1975.

The White Factory—the seat of the museum—is a complex of classicist buildings erected by the family of Ludwik Geyer in the years 1835 – 1886. It is considered one of the most beautiful and unique monuments of industrial architecture in Poland. It owes its exceptionalness to the four-wing mill, the building of the Old Boiler House in the middle of a big courtyard, a high chimney, two dust towers and two water-towers. The process of renovating and adjusting the White Factory to the museum's objectives began in 1955, when authorities took a decision to designate it as the future location of the museum.

In 2008, the Central Museum of Textiles was extended by establishing an Open-air Museum of the Łódź Wooden Architecture.

== Activities ==
The scientific, collection, and promotional interests of the museum concentrate around everything related to textile manufacturing process—from materials and textile techniques and technologies through to textiles products representing various degrees of processing. Collections are gathered, scientifically elaborated, conserved and, in various forms, displayed by the specialized thematic departments of the museum.

Since 1972, the museum has cooperated in organising the International Triennial of Tapestry, which it has been the sole host of since 1982. Presently, it is the oldest and biggest world international exhibition-competition promoting contemporary "fibre art". The museum is also the sole organizer and exhibitor of several national events, the National Exhibition of the Polish Tapestry (since 2004), the National Exhibition of the Polish Miniature Textiles (since 1998), and the National Exhibition of the Polish Cross-Stitch Embroidery of Amateur Artists (since 2000). Each of these is visited by several dozen thousand people.

=== Permanent exhibits ===
- "The old industrial plants of Ludwik Geyer 1828 – 2002"
- "Textile tools and machines in the collection of the Central Museum of Textiles"
- "Weaving room from the end of the 19th century" – machines in motion
- "With fashion through the 20th century"

=== Educational offer ===
The Department of Education of the Central Museum of Textiles organizes art workshops, museum lessons and film presentations of material connected with the museum's profile, educating people about fibre art and history, museum's collections and current exhibitions. One of their educational offer is "Geyerwerki" directed to children with parents. The aim of the workshops is to learn certain textile techniques and to apply it making use of materials and tools provided by the organizer.

=== Special events ===
- Geyer Music Factory – concerts during holiday season, at the courtyard of White Factory (since 2009)
- Feast "Sunday at Geyer" – April
- Night of Museums – May

== Sources ==
- [Information leaflet] The White Factory of Ludwik Geyer. Open-air Museum of Łódź Wooden Architecture, The Central Museum of Textiles, Łódź 2010 ISBN 978-83-60146-09-5.
- P. Jaworski, L. Maćkowiak-Kotkowska, K. Stanilewicz, Dawne zakłady Ludwika Geyera 1828-2002 (The old industrial plants of Ludwik Geyer 1828–2002), Centralne Muzeum Włókiennictwa, Łódź 2002.
- A. Berkowicz, Geyerowska legenda (Geyerian legend), Wydawnictwo Łódzkie, Łódź 1961.
- P. Jaworski, Biała Fabryka Ludwika Geyera w Łodzi (Ludwik Geyer's White Factory in Łódź), Centralne Muzeum Włókiennictwa, Łódź 2005, ISBN 83-918834-3-4.

== See also ==
- E. M. Sigsworth, „Fosters of Oueensbury and Geyer of Lodz 1848-1862”, [in:] Bulletin of Economic Research, Volume 3, Issue 2, pages 67–82, July 1951.
