= Łódź Wooden Architecture Skansen =

Open-air Museum of the Lodz Wooden Architecture
- Skansen Łódzkiej Architektury Drewnianej
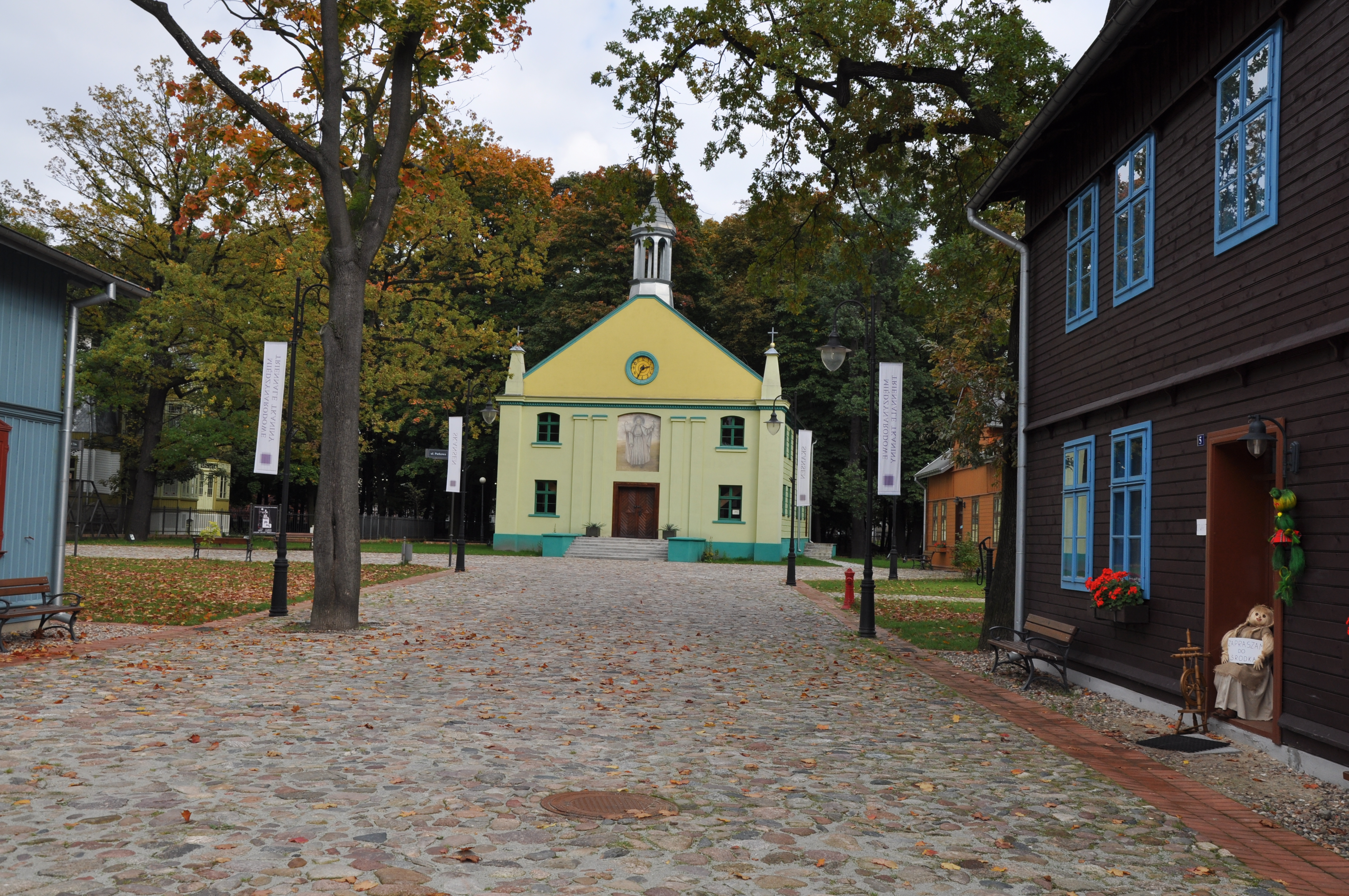

- Location within Poland
- Established: 2008
- Location: Piotrkowska Street 282, 93 - 034 Łódź, Poland
- Coordinates: 51.7452°N 19.4616°E
- Type: Wooden architecture museum
- Director: Norbert Zawisza
- Architects: Anita Luniak and Teresa Mromlińska
- Website: www.muzeumwlokiennictwa.pl/o-skansenie/

Open-air Museum of the Łódź Wooden Architecture is an integral part of the Central Museum of Textiles in Łódź. It is located on the main artery of Łódź, Piotrkowska Street, next to the Władysław Reymont Park.

== History ==
The idea to establish an open-air museum detailing wooden architecture of the area came from Krystyna Kondratiukowa, the first director and the founder of the Central Museum of Textiles. This idea was not realized until 2002, when two architects, Anita Luniak and Teresa Mromlińska, won a tender for the design. The museum was under construction from September 2006 until May 2008, and was finally open for visitors in September 2008.

== Exposition ==
The collected objects are typical representatives of architecture in Łódź at the turn of the 19th-20th century. These specimens include a church (transported from Nowosolna), a summer villa (transported from Ruda Pabianicka), a one-storey house for workers (from Mazowiecka Street), a wooden tram-stop (from Zgierz) and four craftsman's houses (from Żeromskiego, Mazowiecka and Kopernika Streets). Additional elements such as lamps, wells, signs with street names, complete the reconstruction of life at that time. The building contain exhibits of different craft such as weaving and ceramics, and some are active workshops. Visitors can purchase products made by the manufacturers and take part in activities organized there.

== Sources ==
[Information leaflet] The White Factory of Ludwik Geyer. Open-air Museum of Łódź Wooden Architecture, The Central Museum of Textiles, Łódź 2010, ISBN 978-83-60146-09-5
