= Piotrkowska Street =

Street in Łódź, Poland

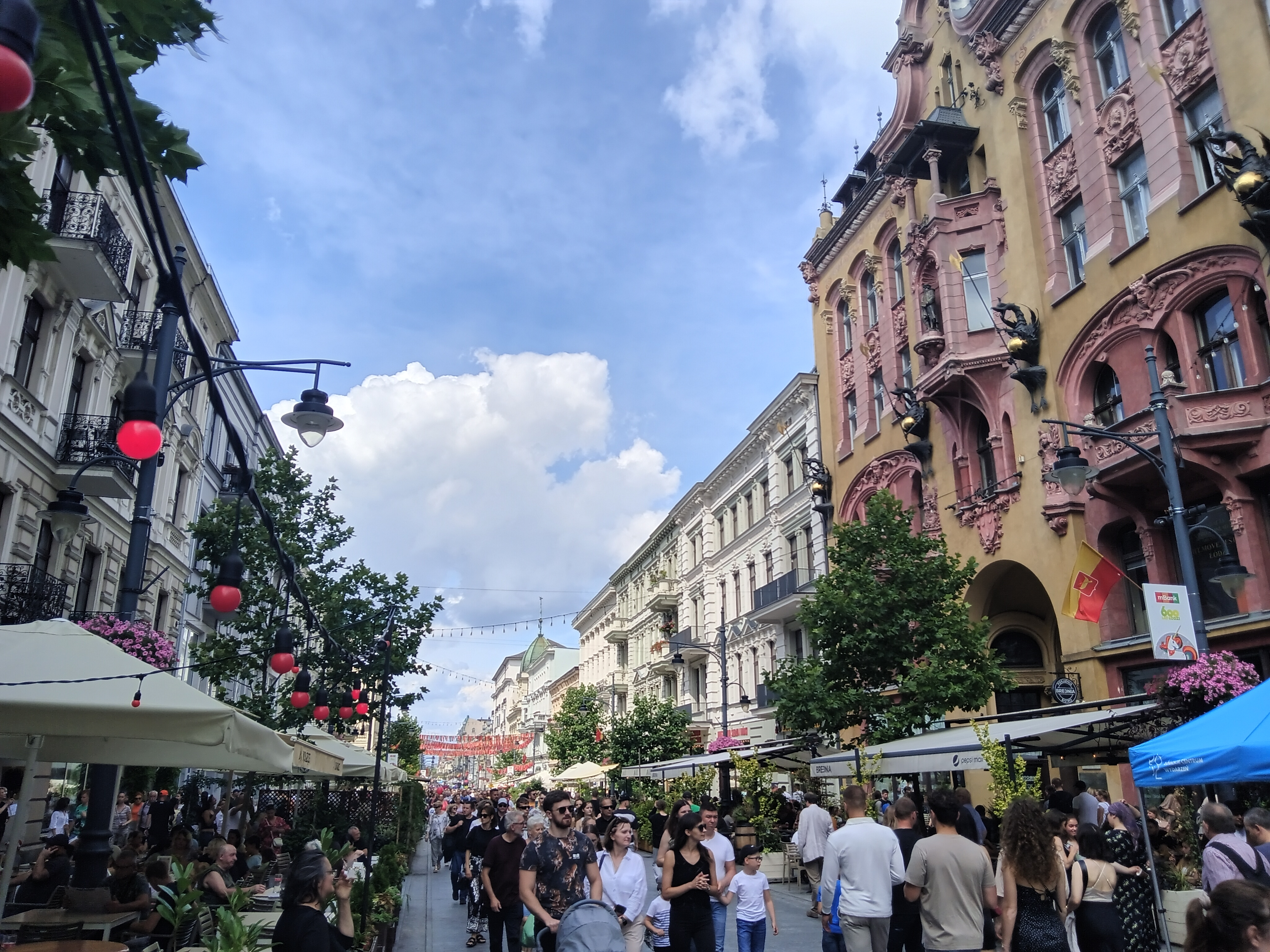
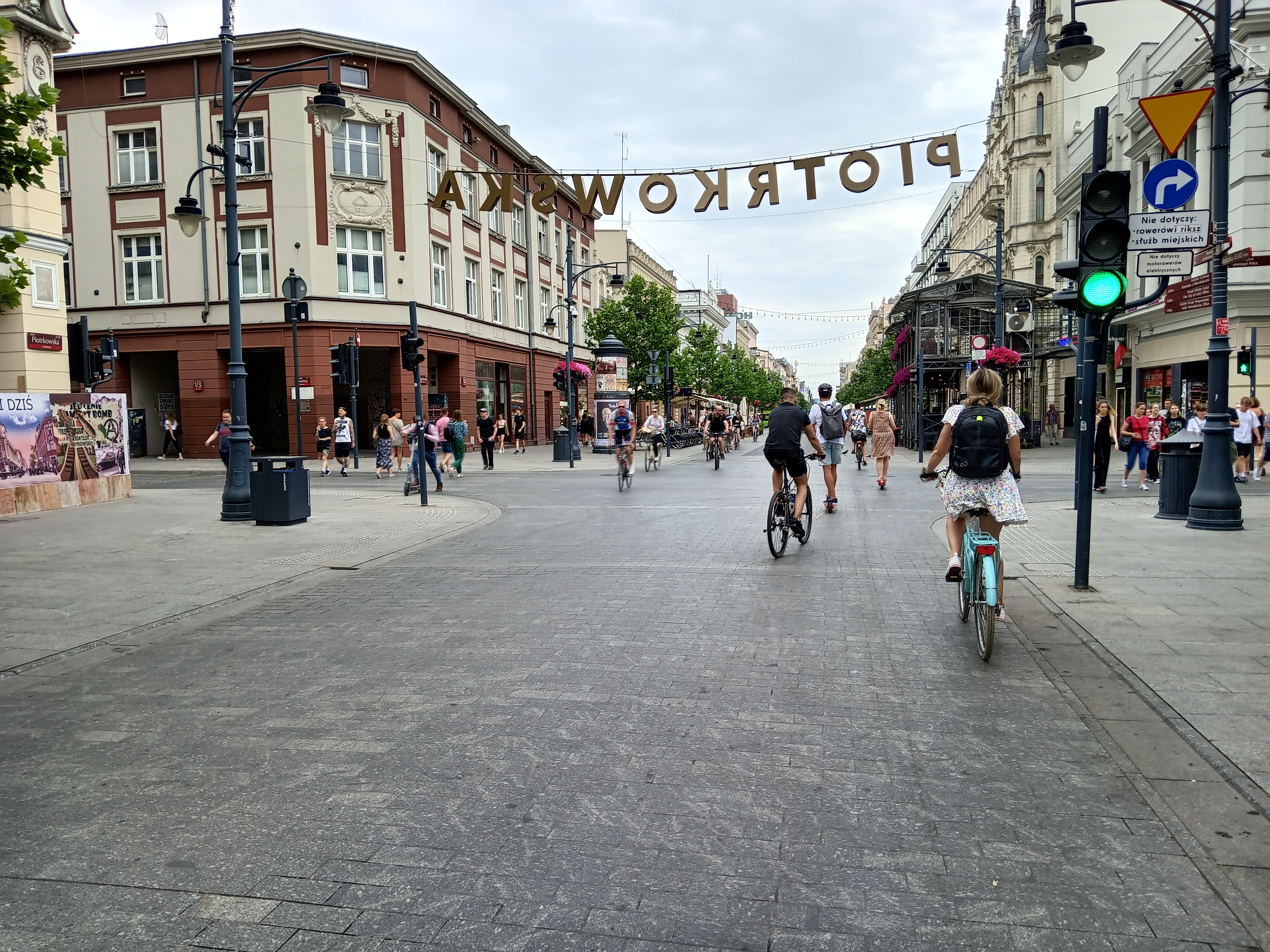
- Piotrkowska Street (2023)
- Interactive map of Piotrkowska Street
- Length: 4.2 km (14,000 ft)
- Location: Łódź, Poland

Construction
- Inauguration: 1823

Piotrkowska Street (pronounced: [pjɔtrˈkɔfska]; Polish: ulica Piotrkowska), also popularly known as Pietryna, is the main artery of Łódź, Poland. It is one of the longest commercial thoroughfares in Europe, with a length of approximately 4.2 kilometres (2.6 mi), and one of the major tourist attractions of Łódź. It runs longitudinally in the straight line between the Liberty Square (plac Wolności) and the Independence Square (plac Niepodległości).

Originally a dirt tract leading to medieval Piotrków, the street was established in 1823 and underwent rapid transformation during the First and Second Industrial Revolution, evolving alongside the city's rise as a textile manufacturing centre of Congress Poland. It acted as the central axis around which Łódź grew bigger, and its development gave the present urban shape. As the settlement grew rapidly without a traditional central market square, Piotrkowska assumed the role of the city's primary commercial, social, and administrative core, subsequently becoming a showcase of wealth, ambition, and eclectic architecture.

The street deteriorated remarkably after World War II; following the decline of the traditional textile industry in the late 20th century, it underwent a comprehensive revitalisation program aimed at pedestrianisation and urban renewal. In 1990, it became one of the first thoroughfares to be designated exclusively for pedestrians and public transport, fundamentally altering the spatial dynamics of the city center. Simultaneously, it was paved with commemorative plaques bearing the names of prominent residents and cultural figures, establishing a local walk of fame that honors the city's historical contributors.

Architecturally, Piotrkowska Street functions as an open-air museum, featuring an array of styles that range from Renaissance Revival and neo-Baroque to Art Nouveau and early Modernist forms. The streetscape is characterised by diversely-ornamented tenements, textile magnate palaces and industrial complexes that have since been repurposed. Unlike standard European linear boulevards, Piotrkowska is defined by its deep, interconnected courtyards, which historically provided access to back-alley factories, worker housing, and administrative quarters, and host hidden restaurants, galleries, and public art installations.

Piotrkowska functions as the focal point of public life in Łódź, hosting numerous festivals, open-air concerts, parades, and civic celebrations throughout the year. The street is densely populated with cafes, restaurants, pubs, and theaters, reflecting the city's literary and cinematic heritage.

== History ==
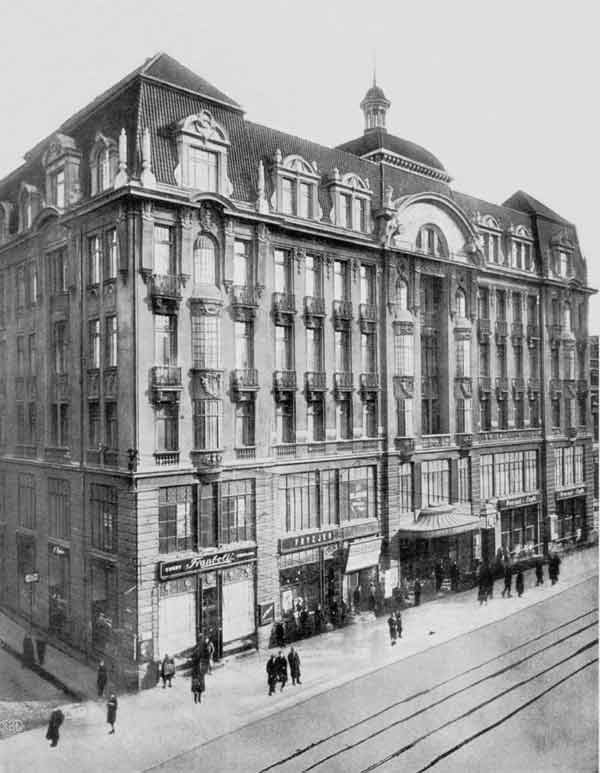
The Grand Hotel, Piotrkowska Street 72

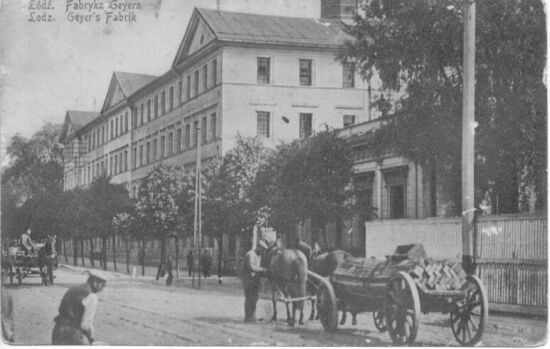
The White Factory, Piotrkowska Street 282

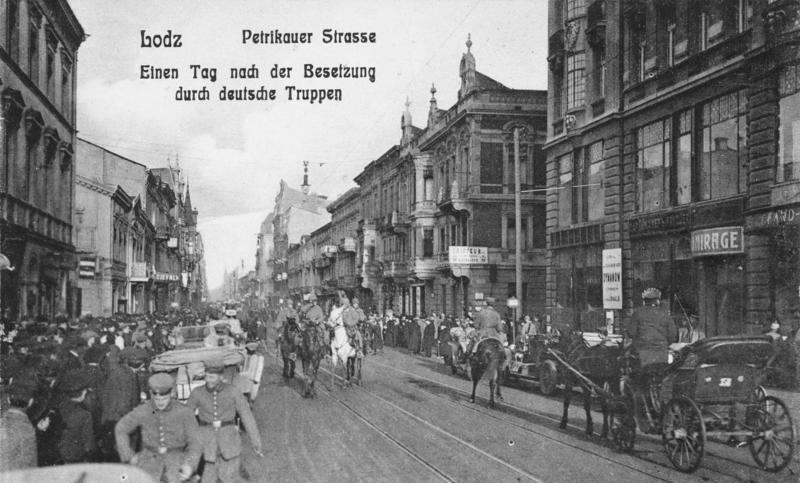
Piotrkowska Street in 1914

In the beginning, the present Piotrkowska Street functioned as a medieval trade route connecting Piotrków Trybunalski and Zgierz. At the time, Łódź was a modest village situated on the route and was an insignificant contributor to the local economy. Before 1821, the route was known as trakt piotrkowski (the Piotrków Tract). In 1821 Rajmund Rembieliński - the president of the Commission of the province of Mazovia - took action in order to regulate the building development in the industrial settlement. This settlement was called The New Town and it was situated in the south from the old village of Łódź. On the street plan of the settlement, the route line was outlined, and along it the cross streets and standard 17.5–21 meters wide plots with a surface area of one morgen, allotted to weavers and craftsmen. Standard houses were built on those plots – a workshop, which stood facing the route, whereas the rest of the plot was a garden for the owner's family.

At the northern end of the route, the New Town Market was outlined (now the Liberty Square), which had stood in the south from the Old Town Market. At first (around 1815) the name Piotrkowska Street was used to describe the northern part of the route joining both markets, whereas the southern part (the present Piotrkowska Street) did not have a name. This means that Piotrkowska Street was a kind of courtyard and market for the whole New Town. The fact that Łódź had this function, meant that the city never developed a classical city centre with a centrally situated market and co-centrally expanding commercial institutions and public organisations, and Piotrkowska Street took on this role. In 1899, brothers Władysław and Antoni Krzemiński founded the first cinema in Poland at Piotrkowska Street. After the Nazi invasion of Poland, the occupying Germans changed the name of the street to Adolf Hitler Strasse. After the war, the street regained its original Polish name.

Several notable artists were born or lived at Piotrkowska Street, including renown Polish-American pianist Artur Rubinstein, poet and playwright Tadeusz Miciński as well as composer Włodzimierz Korcz. In 1867, American and British Shakespearean actor Ira Aldridge suddenly died at the Paradyż Theater (Piotrkowska 175) before his scheduled performance.

== Revitalisation ==
Before 1990 Piotrkowska Street did not differ much from other streets, although it was the most important street in the city. The plans of changing Piotrkowska Street into a pedestrian zone, resulted only in moving the trams to a horizontal Promenade (today called Kościuszki Avenue).

Before this change the promenade had a function of a pedestrian avenue. In its centre there was a wide green belt, which later on was used as a tram line. There was not enough of political will to change Piotrkowska Street into a real pedestrian precinct, although this idea came back from time to time. The first step was the gradual reduction of street traffic by introducing "no parking" or "you must turn" signs on almost every crossroad from Mickiewicza Avenue to the Independence Square. In 1945-1990 the street suffered from the gradual degradation. Until the 1970s the old, eclectic apartment houses weren't considered by the authorities of those days as historic monuments. Several of them were destroyed and in their places office buildings and shopping centers were built, usually in the international style. In the 1980s some falling off decorative elements of the elevation, dangerous for the passers-by, were simply removed from the walls, even though the renovation of some chosen buildings had already begun.

The character of the street changed only after 1990. In this year an architect and a member of an artistic group "Łódź Kaliska", Marek Janiak, came up with the idea of creating the Piotrkowska Street Foundation. Its goal was to revitalise this street and turning it into a pedestrian precinct. As the first one, a distance between Piłsudskiego Avenue and Tuwima Street was excluded from traffic. It was covered with colorful cobblestones and equipped with modernistic street lights and other elements of the so-called street furniture. It was strongly criticised by art conservatives and culture historians, because it did not suit the general climate of the street.

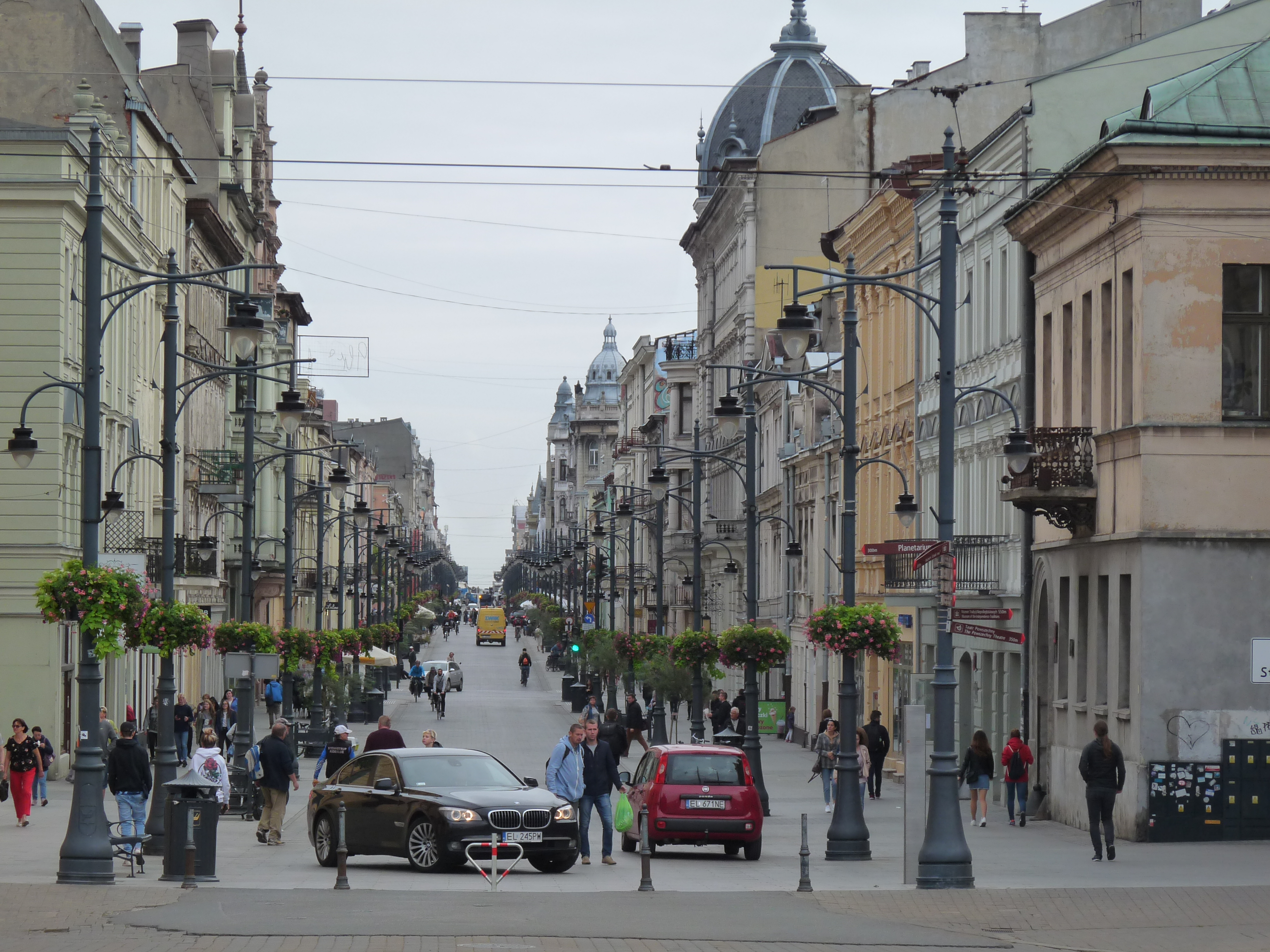
View of the street in 2019

The next parts of the street in the northern direction to the Liberty Square were revitalised and excluded from street traffic in 1993–1997. They were paved with black cobblestones imitating the old pavement and equipped with more and more beautiful elements of the so-called street furniture. Every new part, however, has another kind of surface and another style of decorative elements, which is being criticised as well. Even before the last part of the street, which was meant to be a pedestrian precinct, could be given to the public use, the cobblestones on the first part were remarkably destroyed. From 1995 those cobblestones were gradually replaced by the new ones, which were more grey in color and much more solid. That created a perfect opportunity to build the monument Lodz Citizens of the Millennium.

Together with the decorative changes of Piotrkowska Street, apartment houses and little palaces standing next to it were revitalised. Some pubs, restaurants, shops and cafés moved inside them. At first mainly the front elevations of apartment houses were renovated, but as the popularity of the street increased and some of the most attractive buildings in the front were rented, revitalisation gradually reached also backyards and back-premises. Nowadays, although not all of them, the huge number of backyards are paved with cobblestones and used for trading purposes.

== 21st century ==
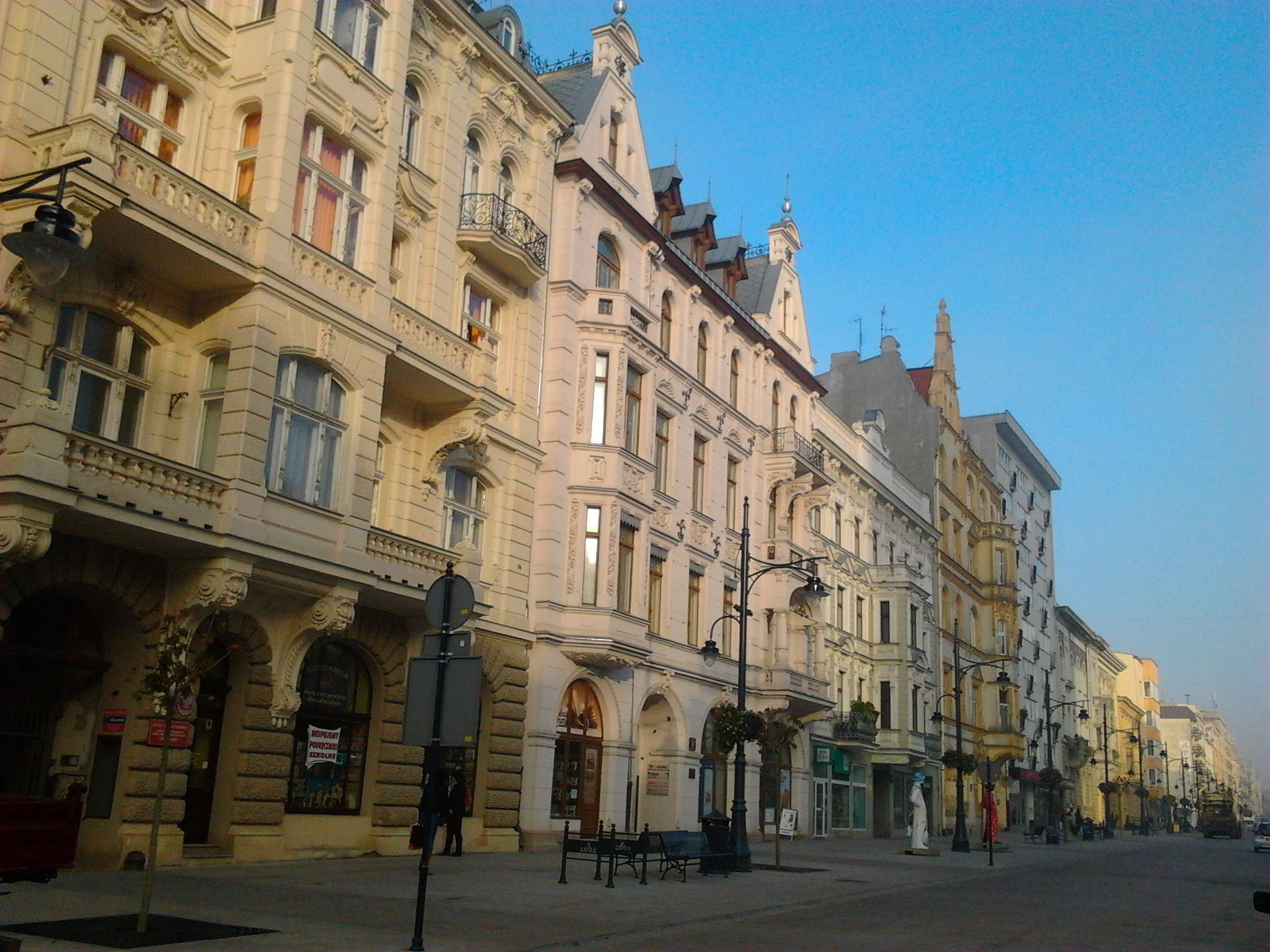
Modern view of the street with colourful apartment buildings

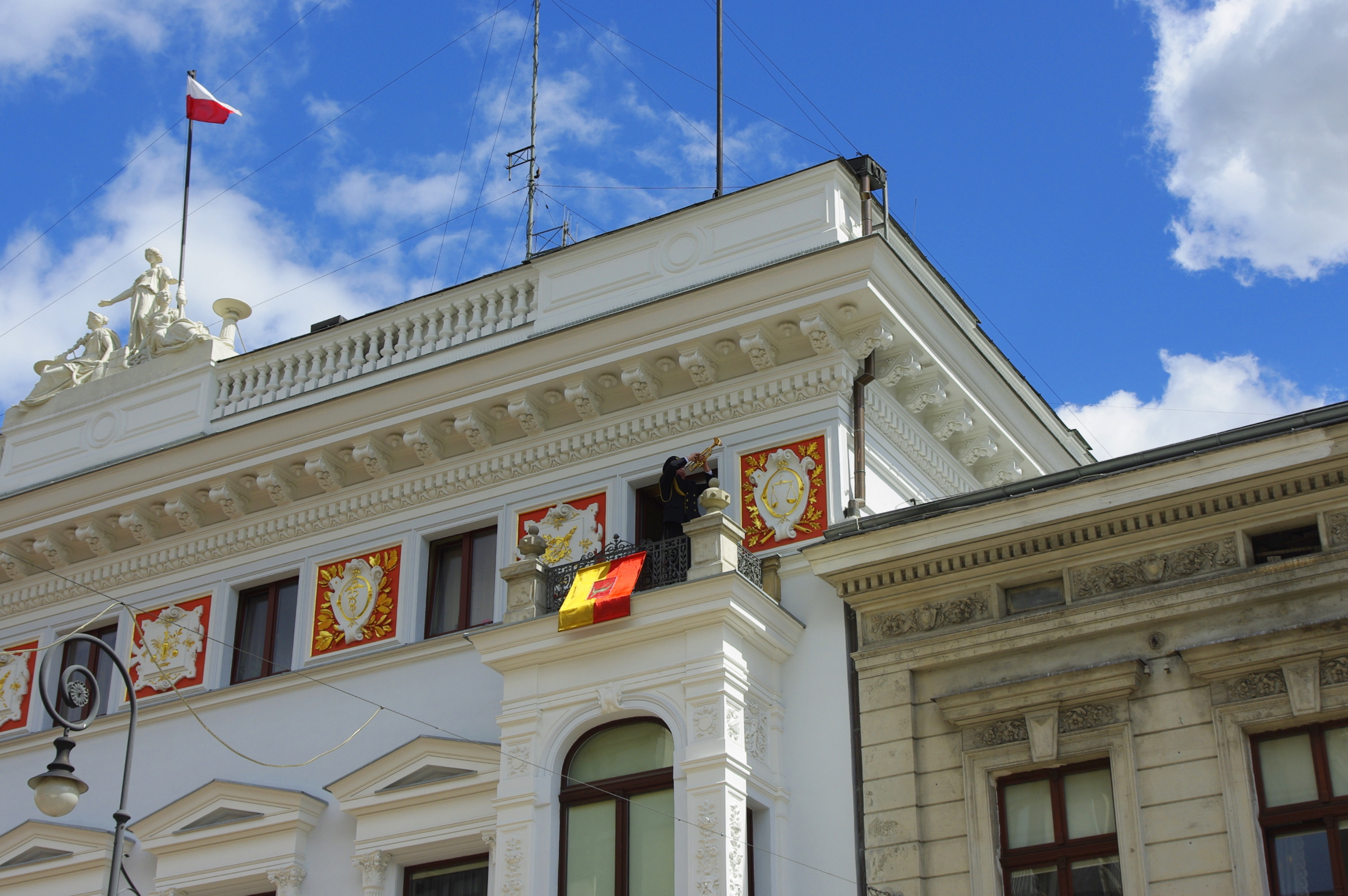
Trumpeter playing Hejnal of Łódź, Juliusz Heinzl Palace, 13 May 2009

Today Piotrkowska Street is the axis of Łódź agglomeration. Here, in its proximity, almost all of the most important administrative offices, banks, shops, restaurants and pubs are situated. Most of the events, outdoor parties, marches and official celebrations, organised by the city of Łódź, take place here.

Piotrkowska, which was called by many people Bigel some time ago, is now more commonly described as Pietryna. It is a cultural, political, sentimental, commercial and business centre of Lodz.

Between Tuwima Street and Nawrot Street there is the Monument of Łódź Citizens of Millennium Change, which is a nominal surface covering the part of Piotrkowska Street. This is probably the only monument of its kind in the world, consisting of 13,454 nominal cobblestones.

Some time ago a huge shopping centre Galeria Łódzka was built next to Piotrkowska Street. This made many shops move from Piotrkowska Street, and that's why we could observe the visible standstill. But after about a year the empty spaces that remained after the previous shops, started to be used again, some of them, however, still stood empty in the beginning of 2006. In this group was one of the most representative- the former Dom Buta. A similar process is being observed after another shopping centre, Manufaktura, was opened next to the northern end of the street.

The northern part of the street is pedestrianised, although emergency and 'security' vehicles are allowed to speed along it - and do so with alarming hostility and frequency, even weaving between the numerous beer gardens in the summer. The width of Piotrkowska Street varies between 17 and 26 meters.

In 2014 a tenement building was covered in mirrors by artist Joanna Rajkowska; known as Rosa's Passage the installation took two years to complete.

=== OFF Piotrkowska ===
OFF Piotrkowska is an alternative dining and shopping area situated in the former Ramisch factory at 138–140 Piotrkowska, which operated as Franciszek Ramisch's cotton mill until 1990.

Food trucks, bars, clubs, alternative music venues, studios, design companies and publishing houses occupy the buildings and open spaces. The usable area is 6,537 sqm and the plot area is 12,898 sqm.

=== Łódź Walk of Fame ===
The walk of fame(pl) on Piotrkowska street, designed by Andrzej Pągowski in 1998, on either side of Piotrkowska: outside the Grand Hotel and across the street, includes: Roman Polański, Pola Negri, Jadwiga Andrzejewska, Jerzy Antczak, Stanisław Bareja, Zbigniew Cybulski, Jacek Fedorowicz, Aleksander Fogiel, Aleksander Ford, Janusz Gajos, Wojciech Jerzy Has, Piotr Hertel, Jerzy Hoffman, Agnieszka Holland, Gustaw Holoubek, Krystyna Janda, Stefan Jaracz, Kazimierz Karabasz, Jerzy Kawalerowicz, Krzysztof Kieślowski, Wojciech Kilar, Edward Kłosiński, Bogumił Kobiela, Marek Kondrat, Krzysztof Kowalewski, Witold Leszczyński, Tadeusz Łomnicki, Jan Machulski, Juliusz Machulski, Janusz Majewski, Roman Mann, Janusz Morgenstern, Andrzej Munk, Leon Niemczyk, Daniel Olbrychski, Cezary Pazura, Franciszek Pieczka, Wojciech Pszoniak, Włodzimierz Puchalski, Stanisław Różewicz, Zbigniew Rybczyński, Jan Rybkowski, Andrzej Seweryn, Piotr Sobociński, Witold Sobociński, Bogusław Sochnacki, Władysław Starewicz, Allan Starski, Danuta Szaflarska, Jerzy Toeplitz, Beata Tyszkiewicz, Andrzej Wajda, Jerzy Wójcik, Zbigniew Zamachowski, Krzysztof Zanussi, and Zbigniew Zapasiewicz.

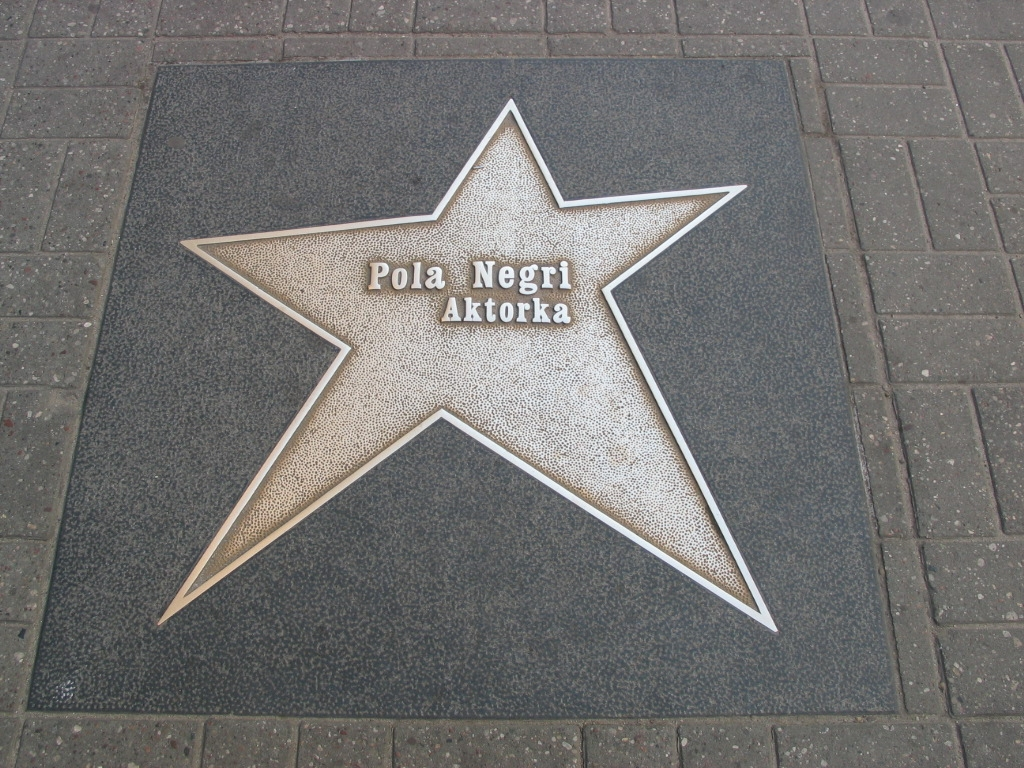

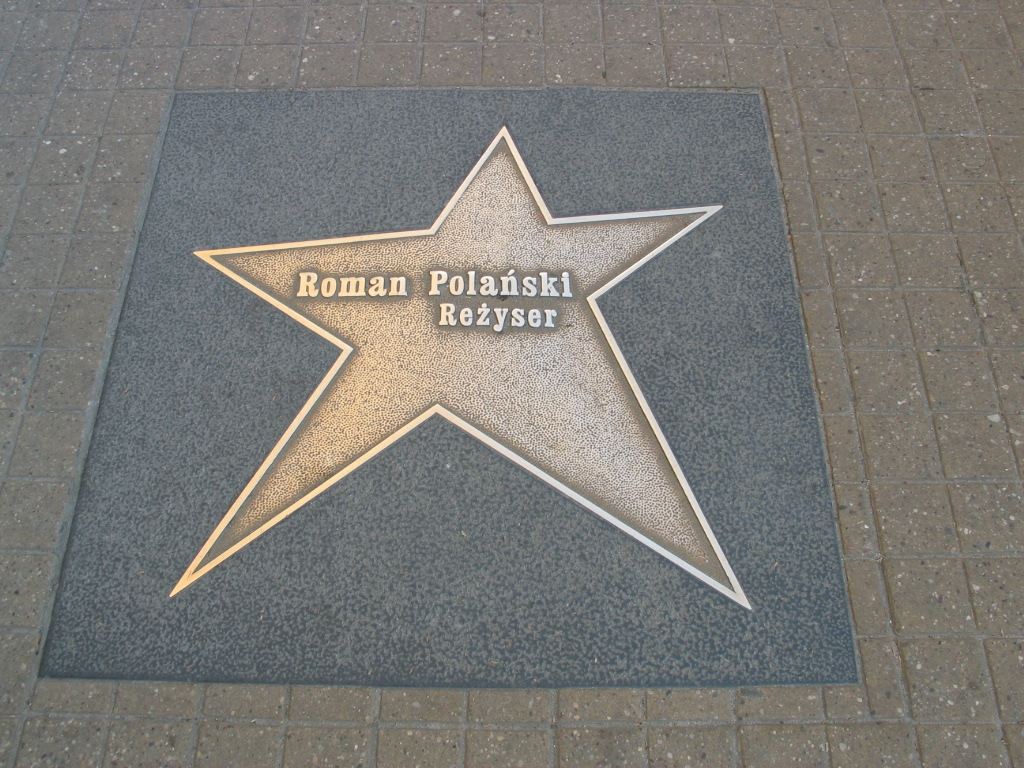

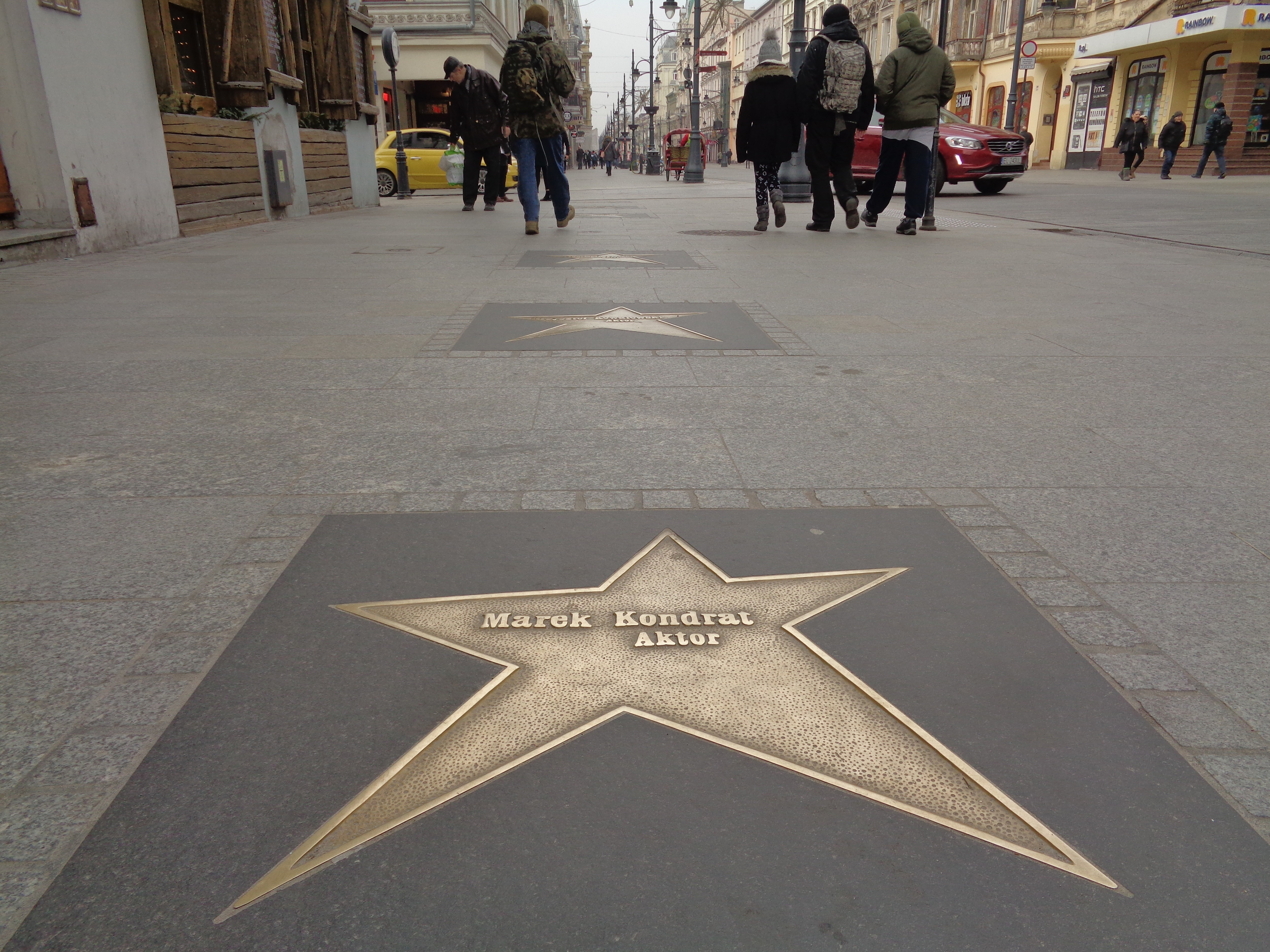

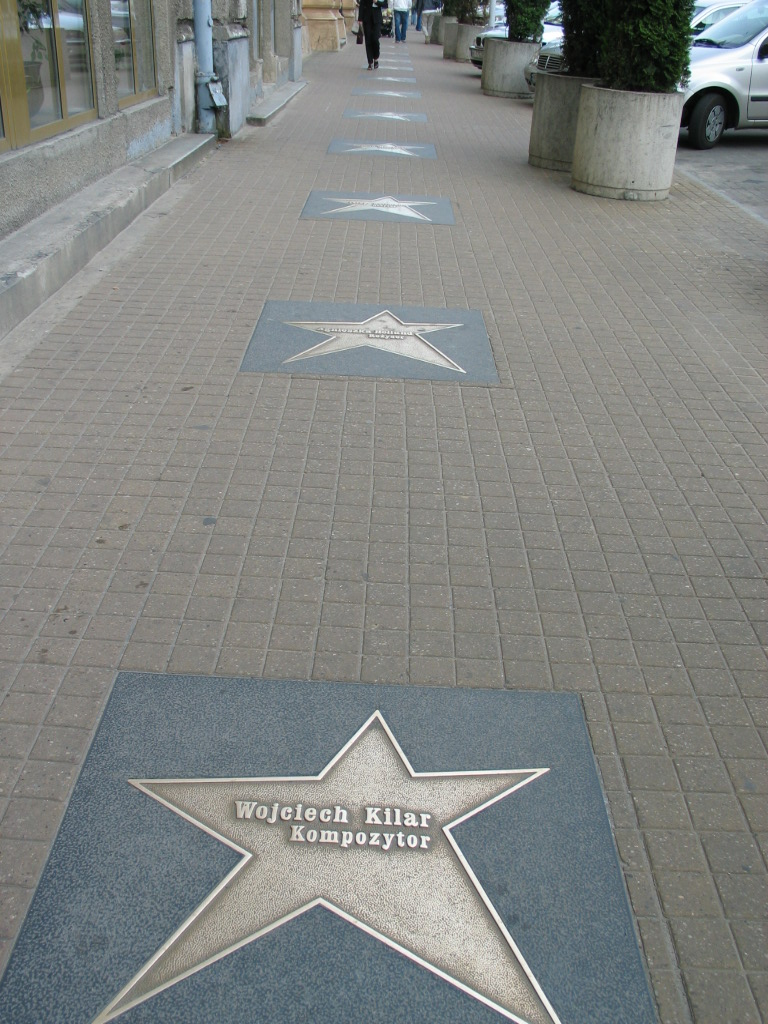

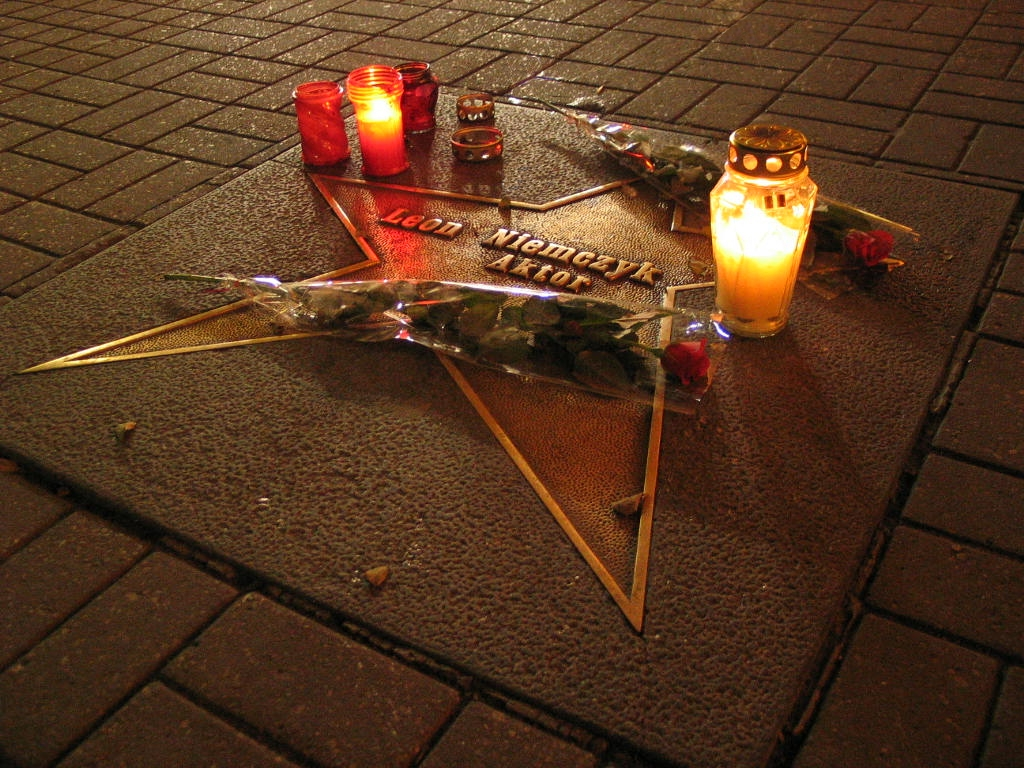

== The road traffic ==
Starting from the Independence Square to the crossing with Mickiewicza and Piłsudskiego Avenues, there is a normal road traffic and this part of the street is covered with an ordinary asphalt and pavements made of concrete panels. On the part from the Independence Square to Żwirki and Wigury Streets, there still is quite an intensive bus and tram traffic. Despite this there are many shops, restaurants and pubs too, although they do not have such a representative character, as those located on the promenade.

== Gallery ==
The fairy tale Goldblum House

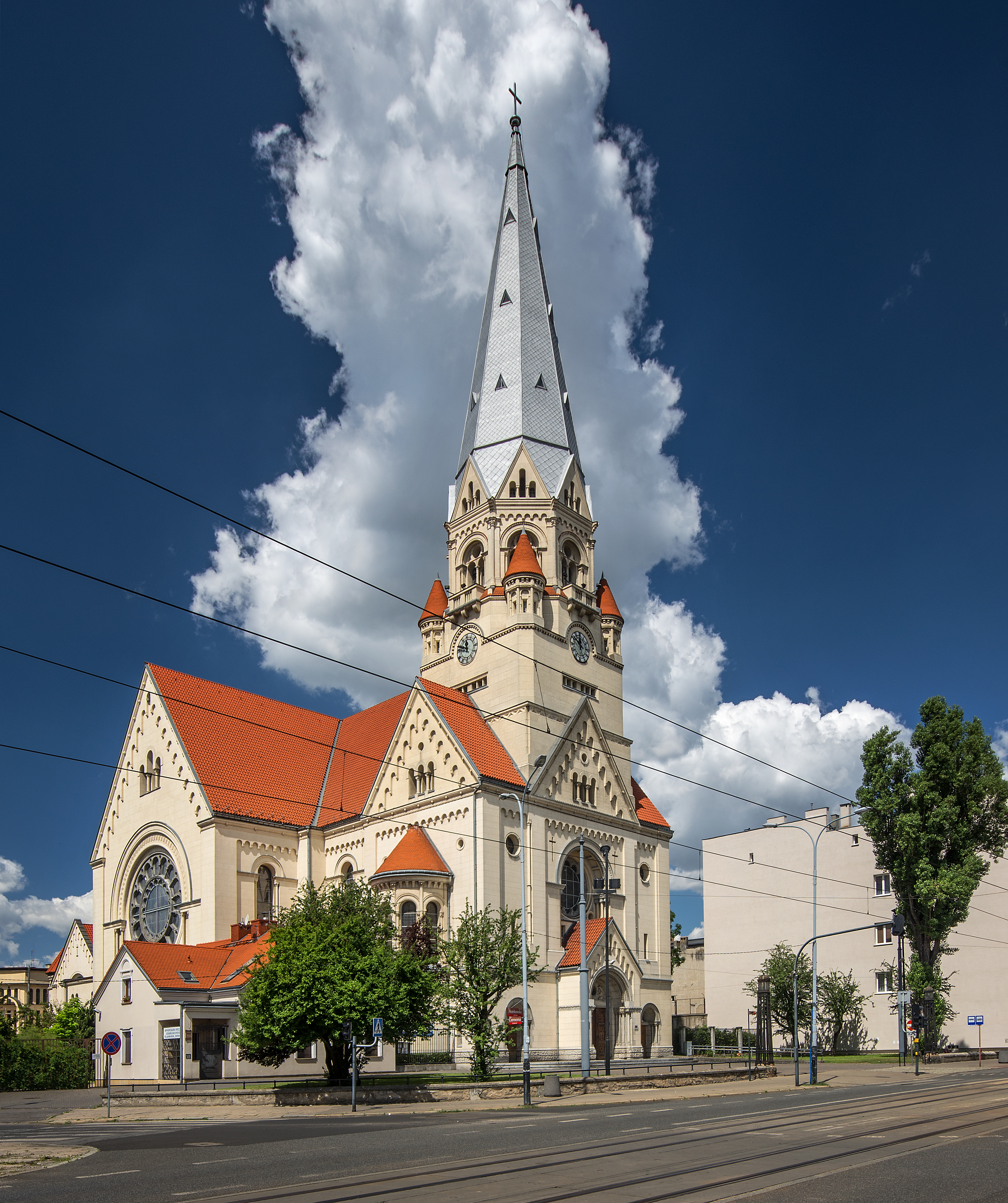
The Protestant St. Matthew's Church

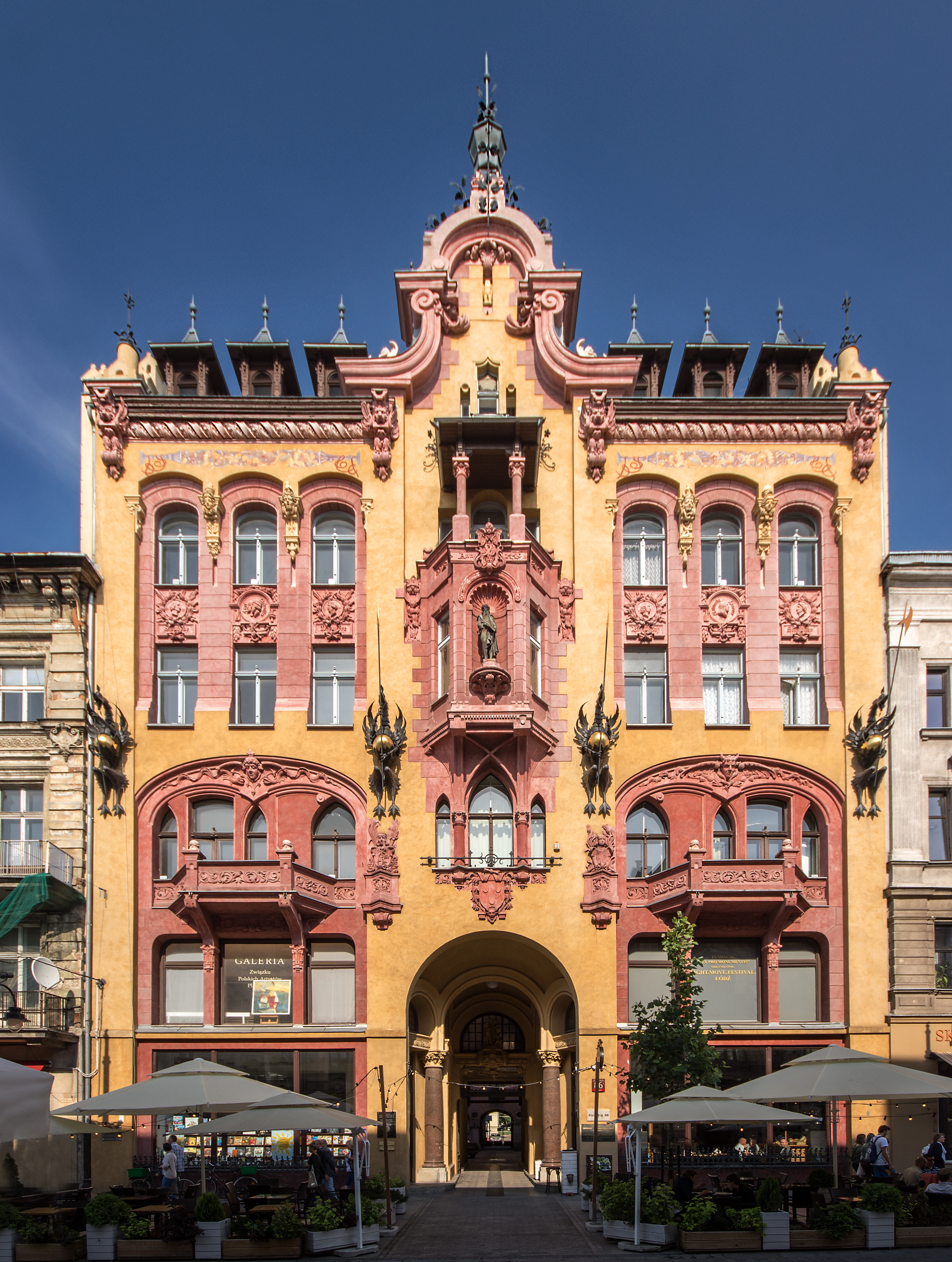
Gutenberg House, former seat of press

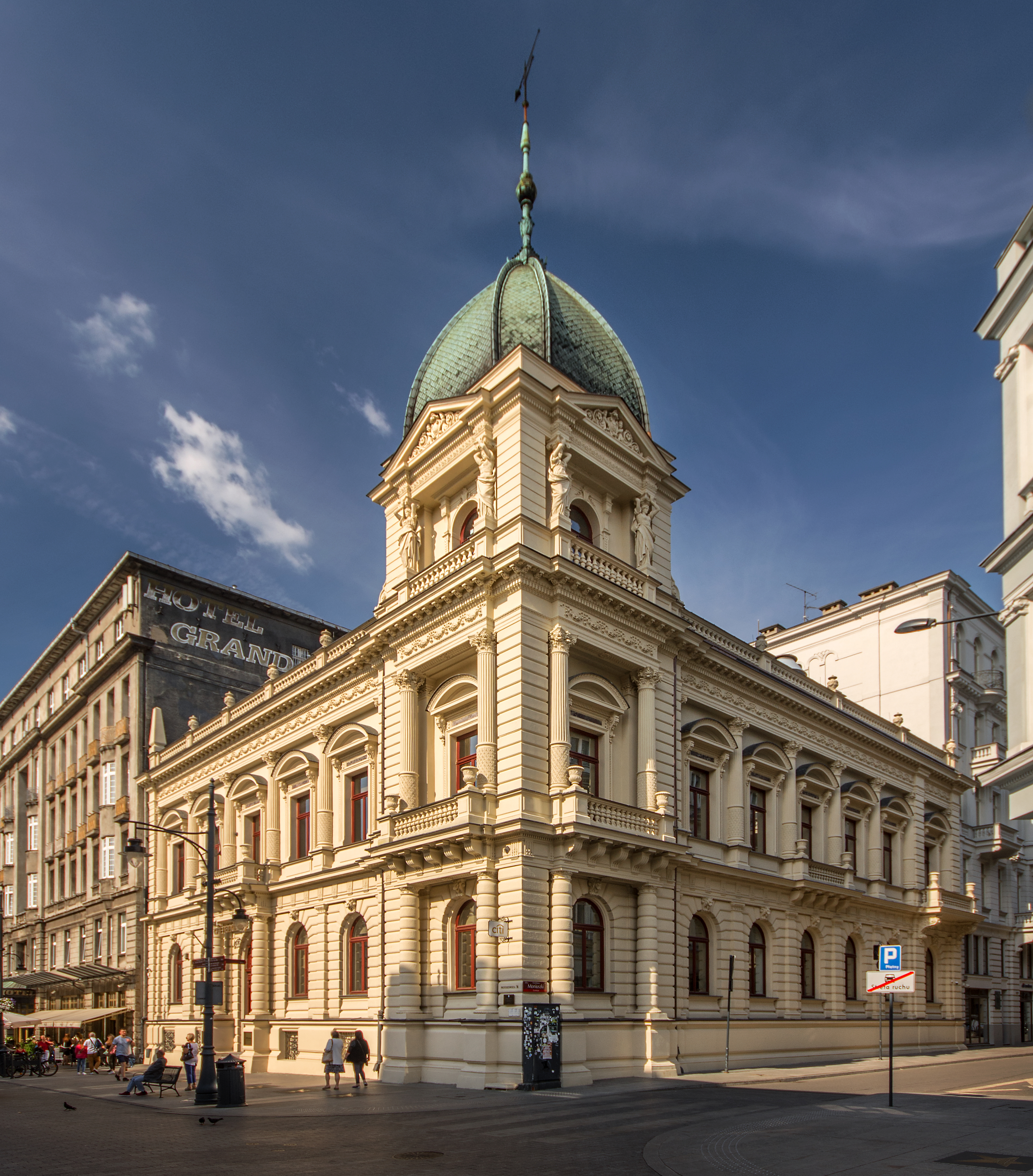
Ludwik Geyer's House, now a bank

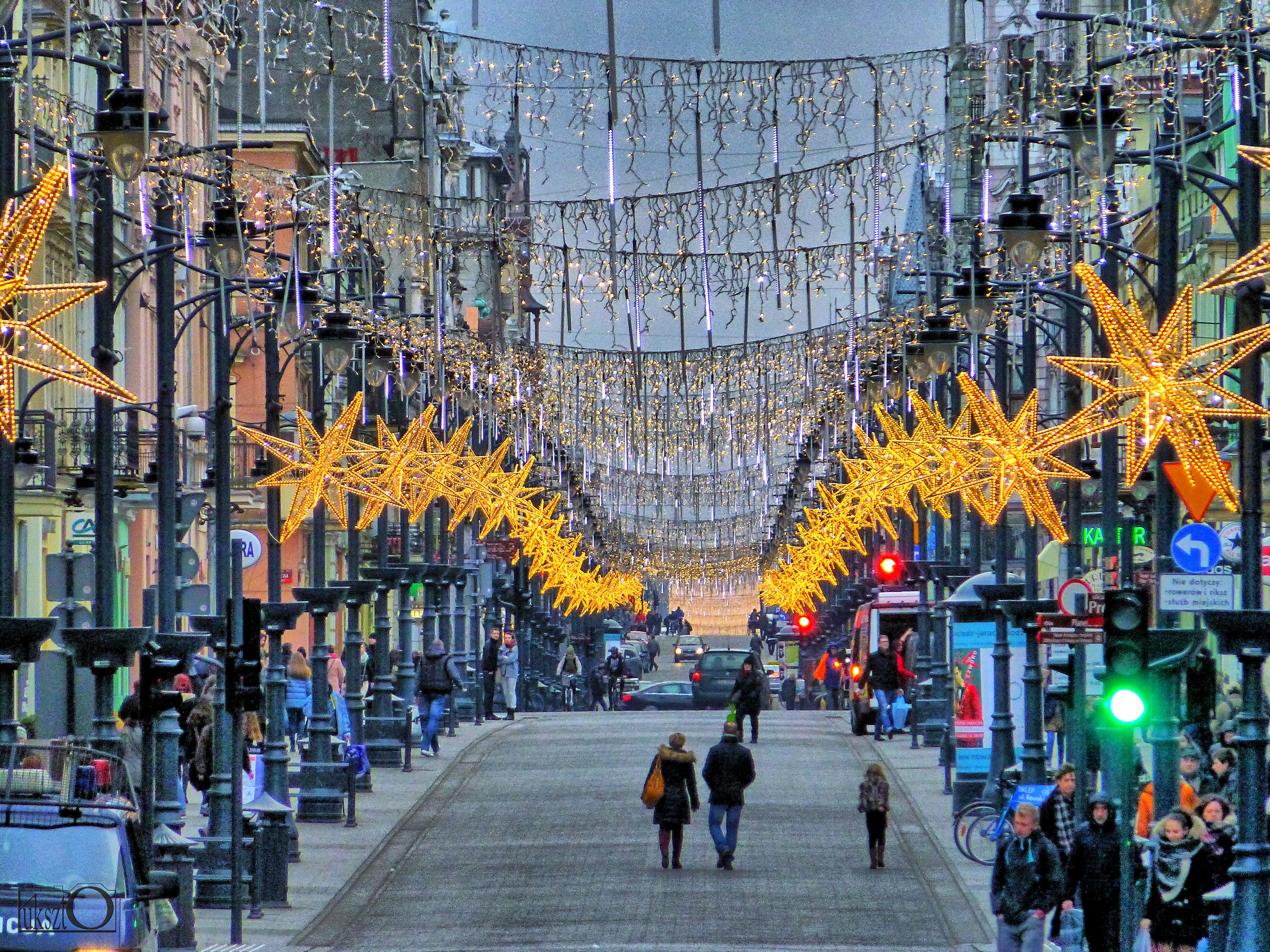
Piotrkowska Street with Christmas decorations in 2016

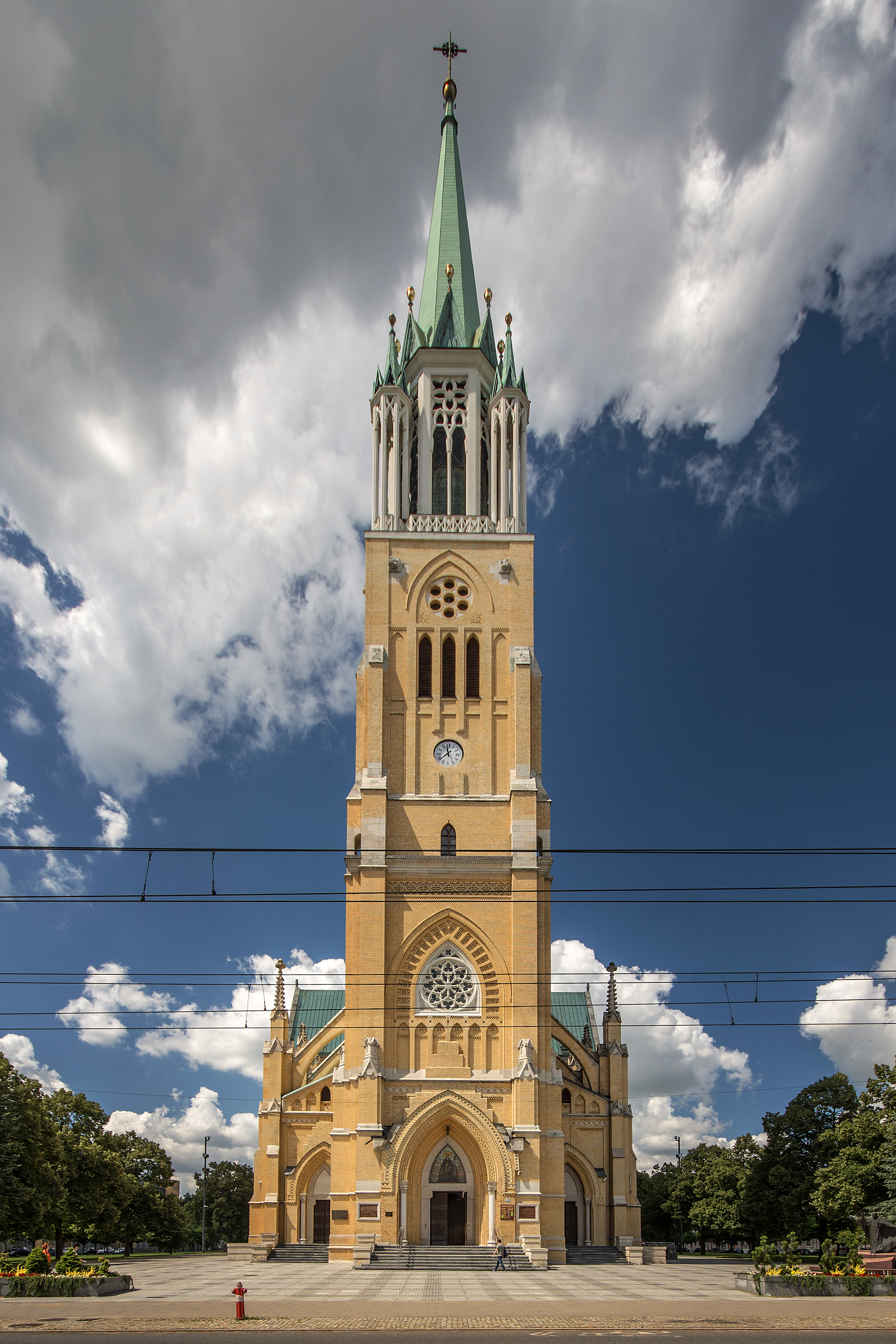
The Catholic Cathedral

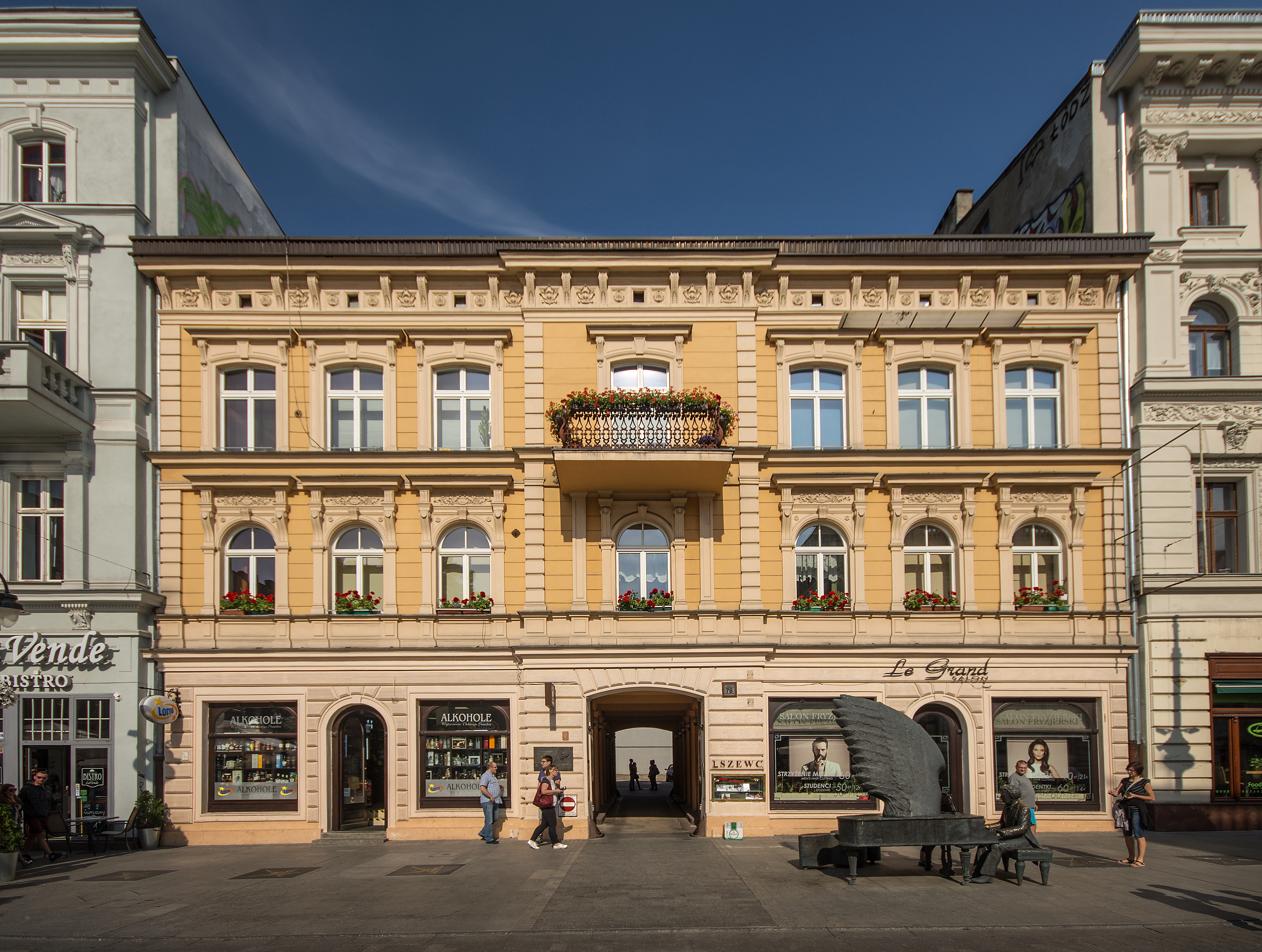
Childhood home and monument of pianist Artur Rubinstein

The White Factory of Ludwik Geyer, now the Central Museum of Textiles

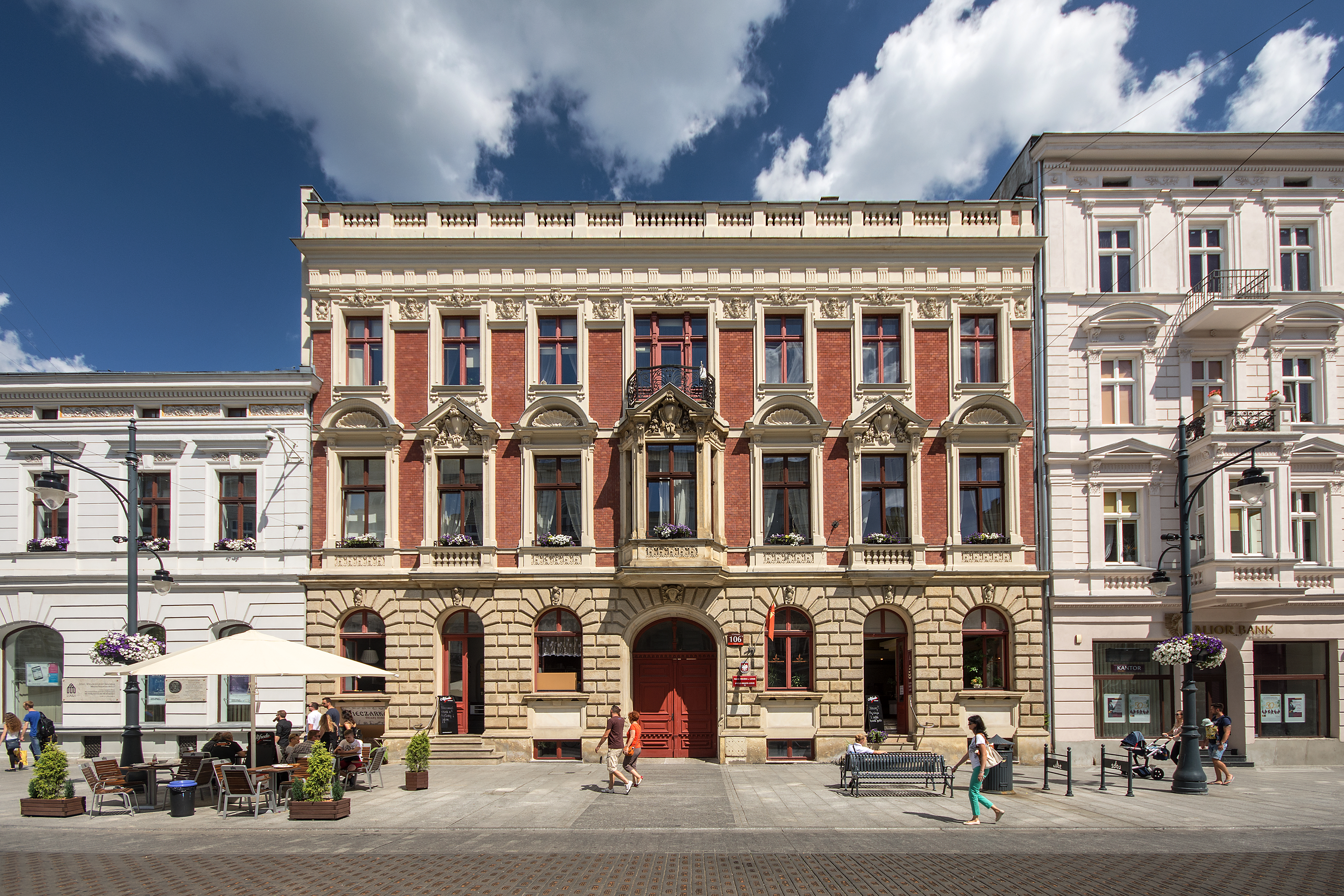
Juliusz Heinzl Tenement, adjacent to the Heinzl Palace which is now the City Hall

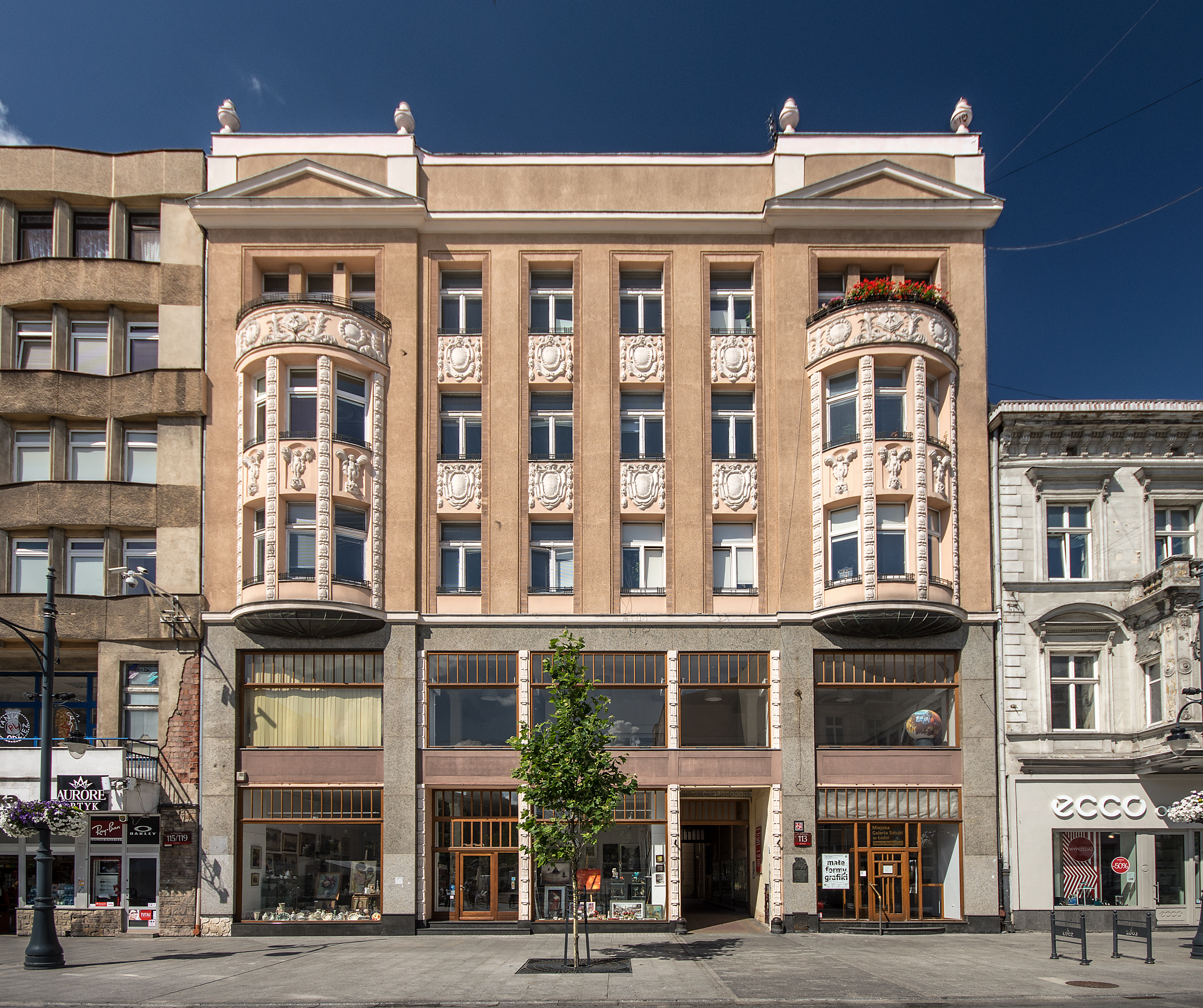
Piotrkowska 113, place of a Nazi racial research camp for kidnapped Polish children

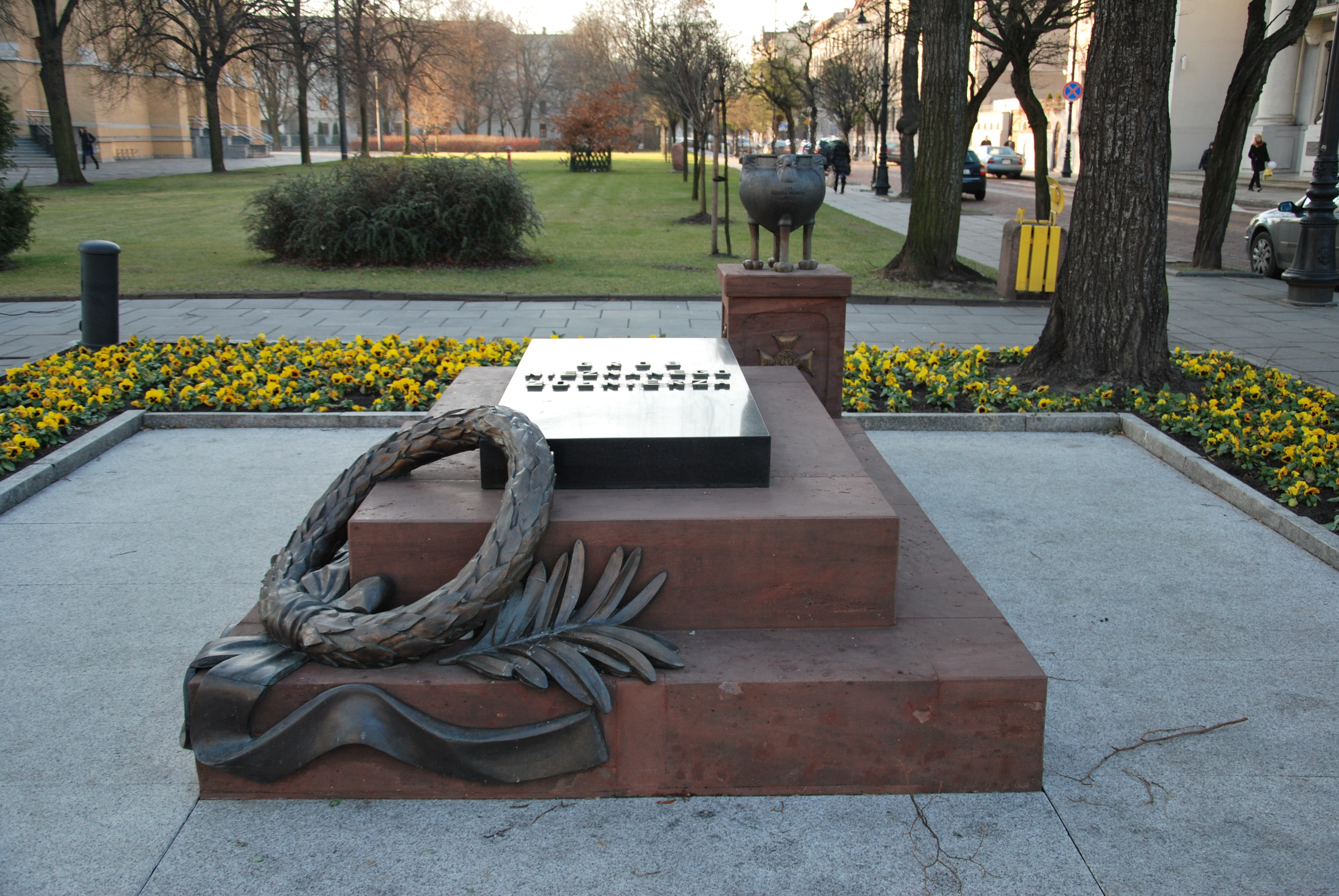
Monument of the Unknown Soldier, erected in 1925

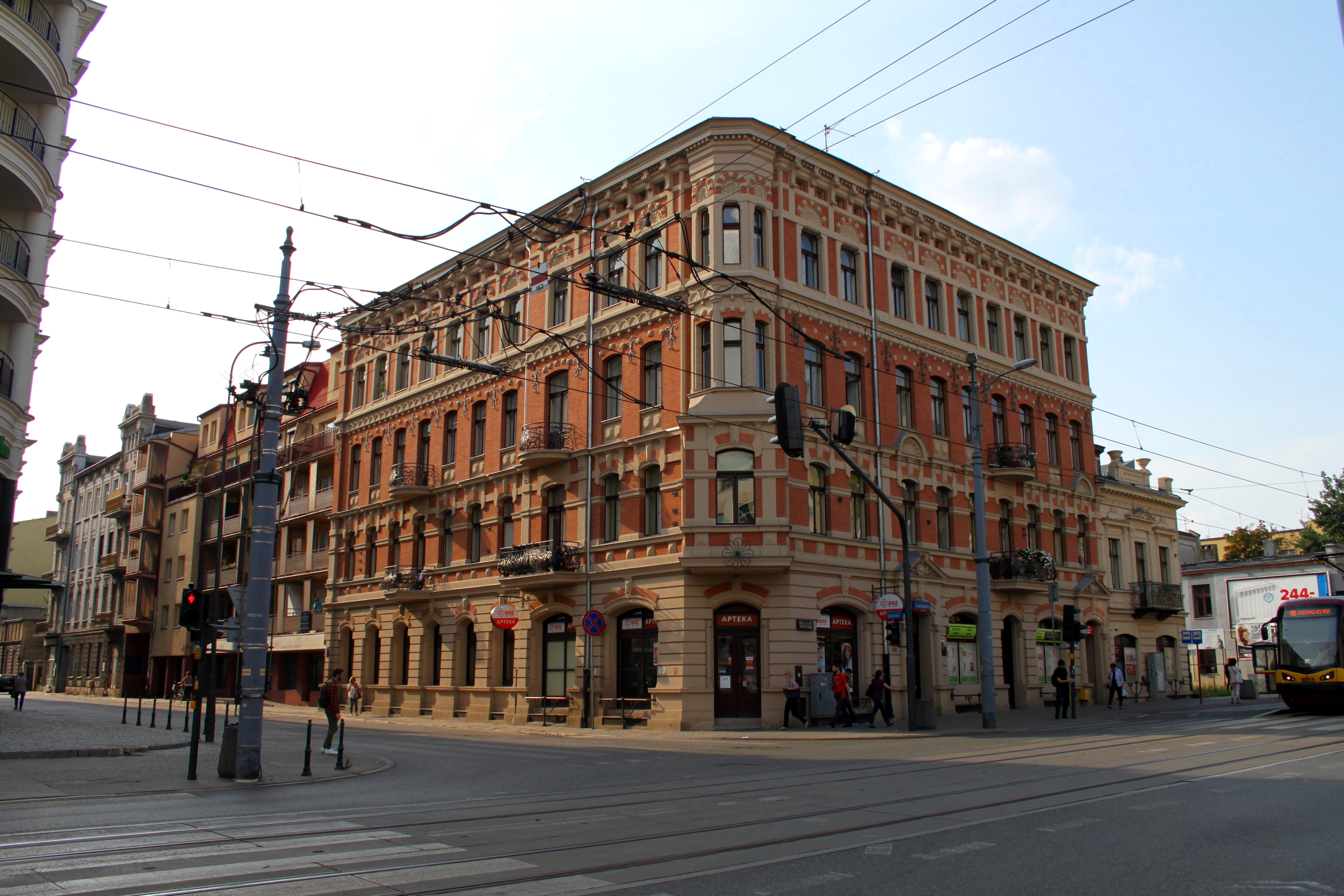
Schmidts' Tenement with one of the oldest pharmacies in the city (ul. Piotrkowska 225)

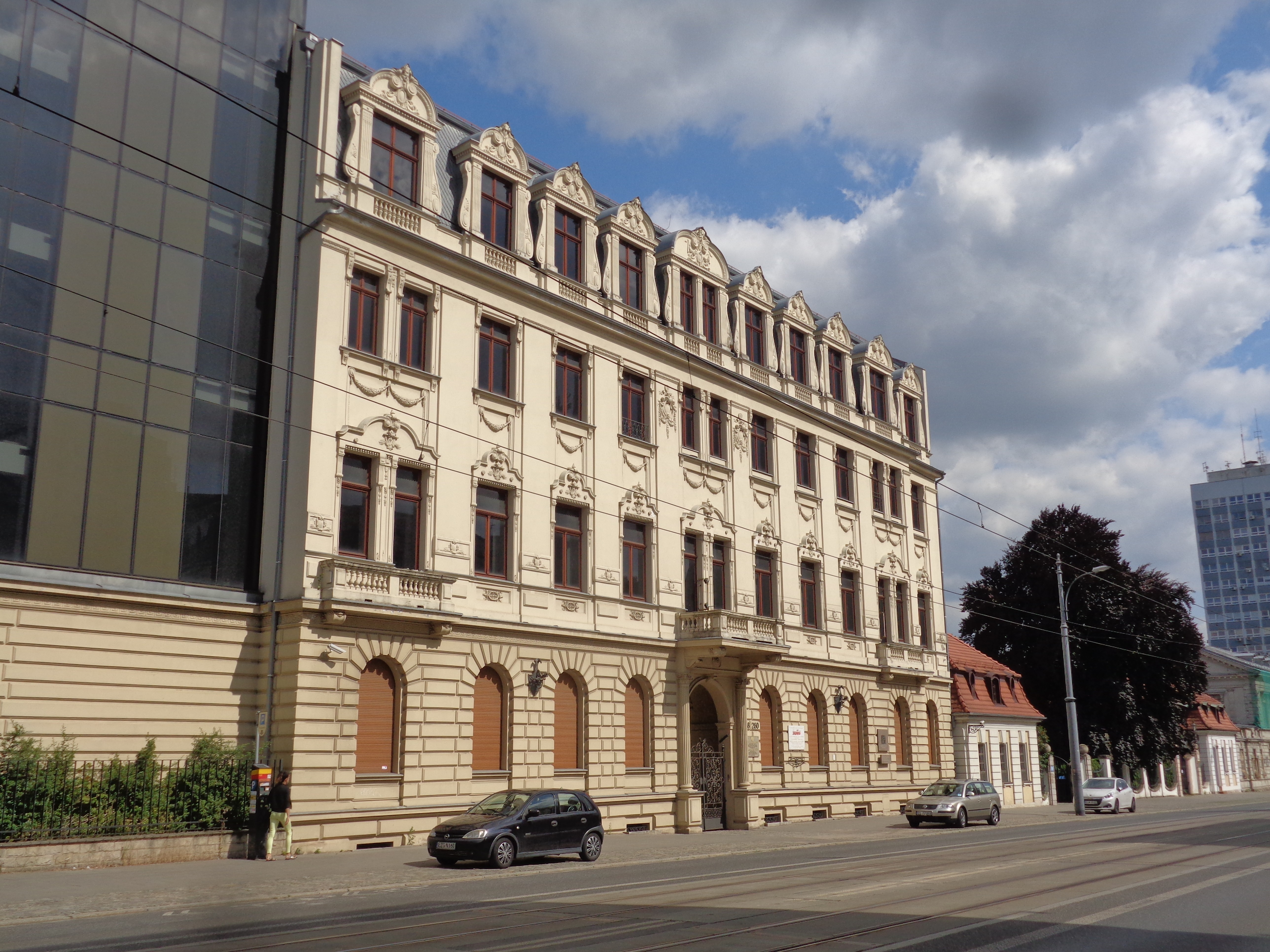
Seat of the regional branch of the Solidarity movement in 1981

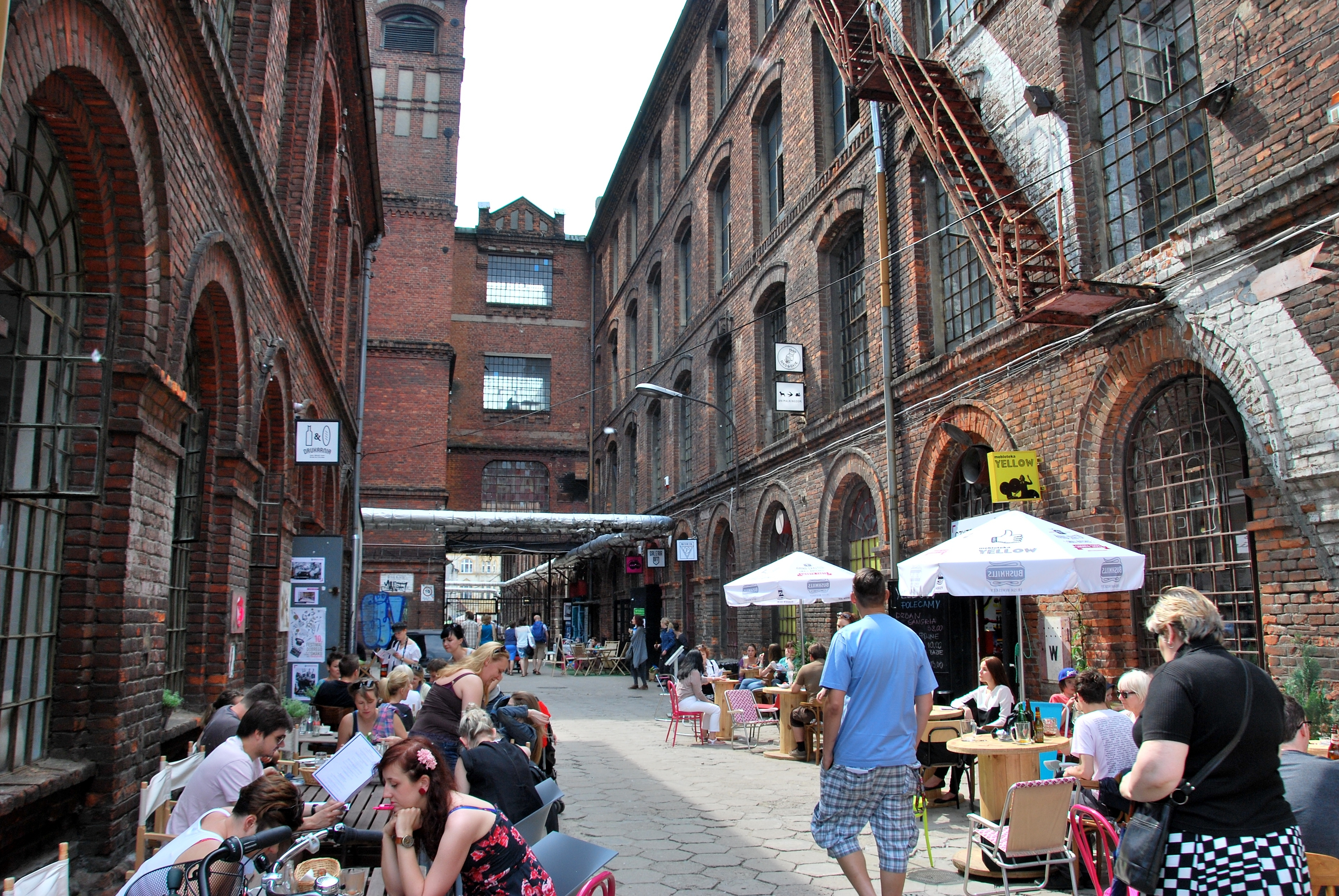
Off Piotrkowska Centre featuring eateries and pubs

Light Move Festival in 2015

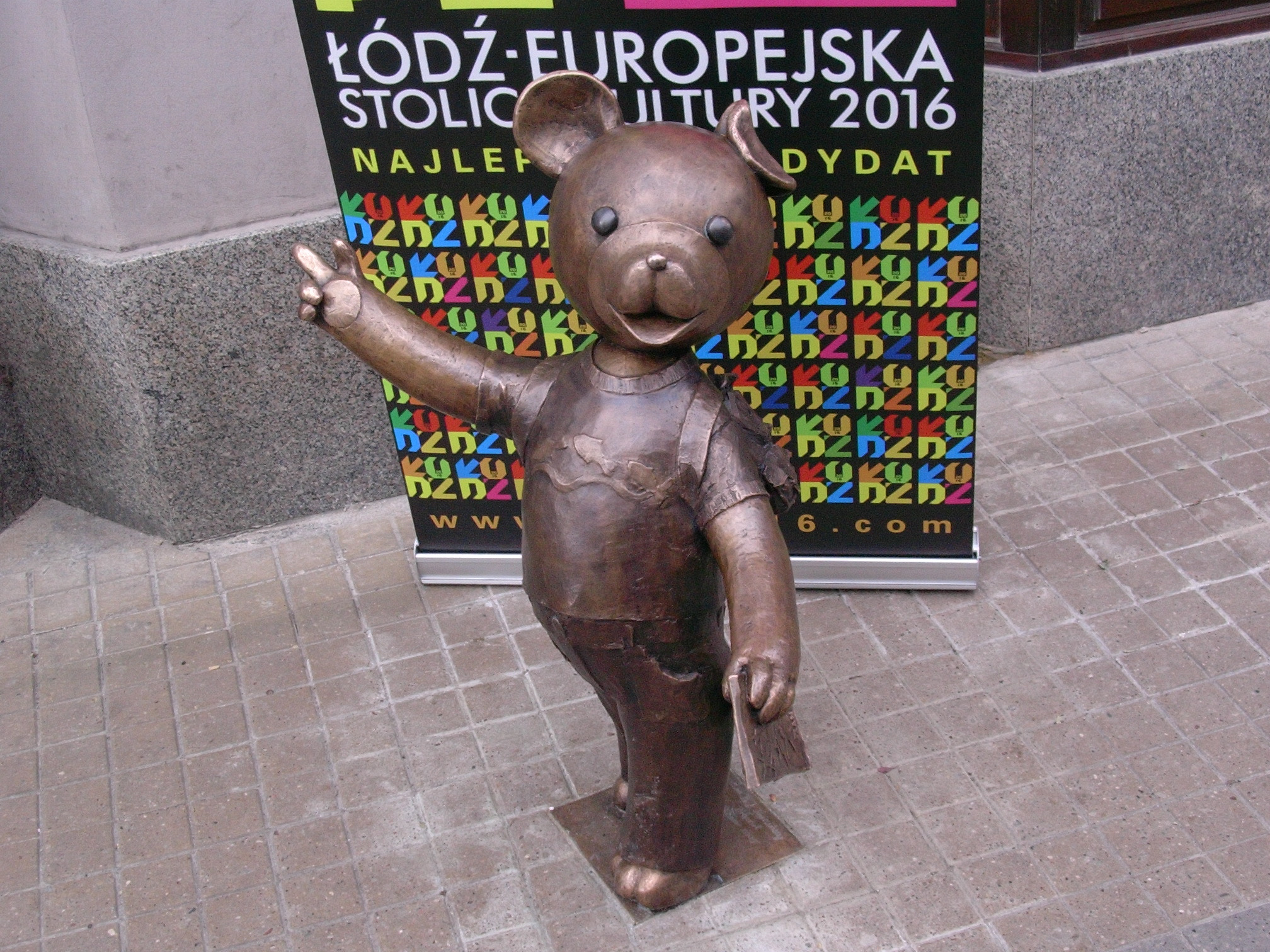
Miś Uszatek (ul. Piotrkowska 87, Tourist Information Centre)

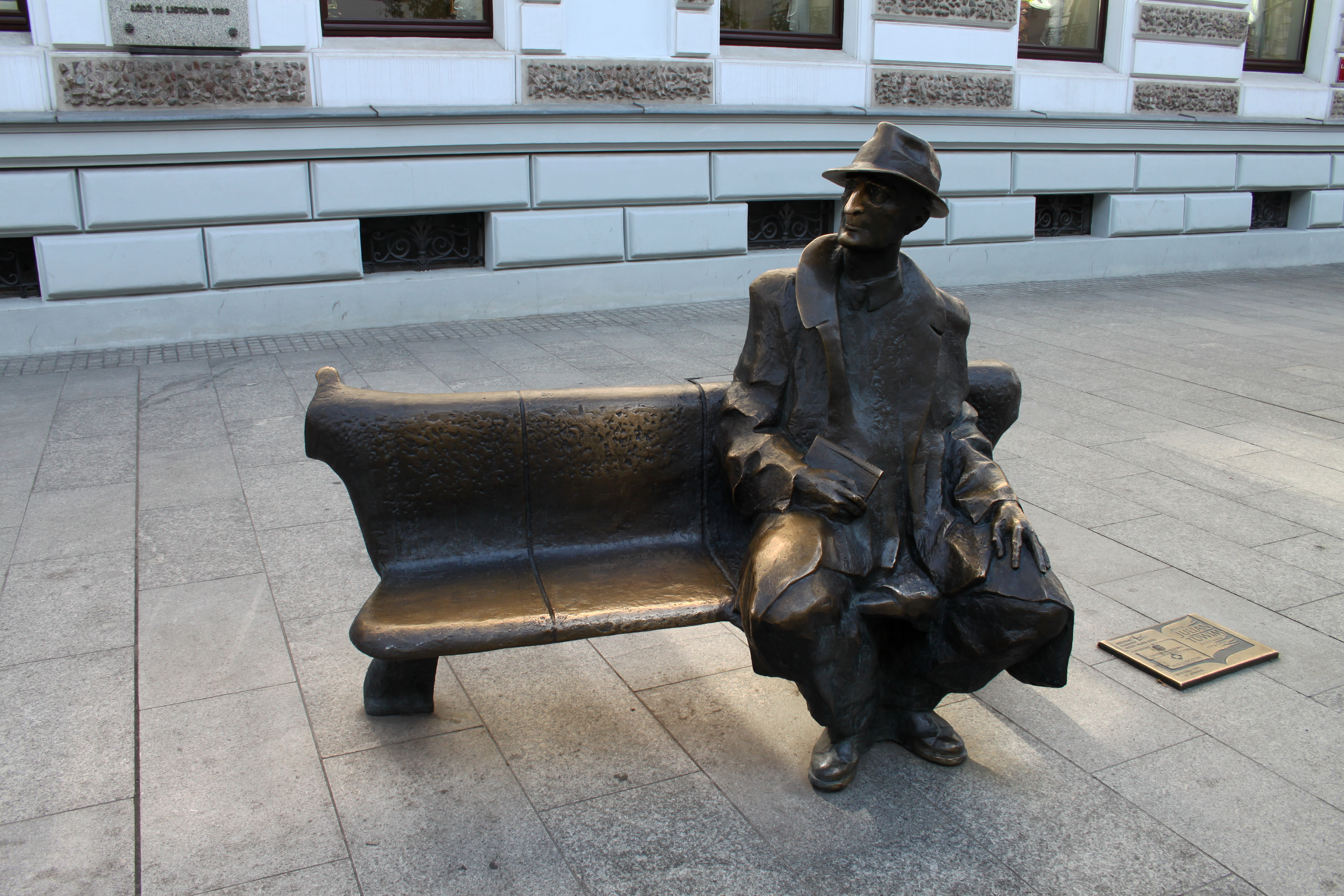
A monument dedicated to Julian Tuwim, known colloquially as "Tuwim's Bench"

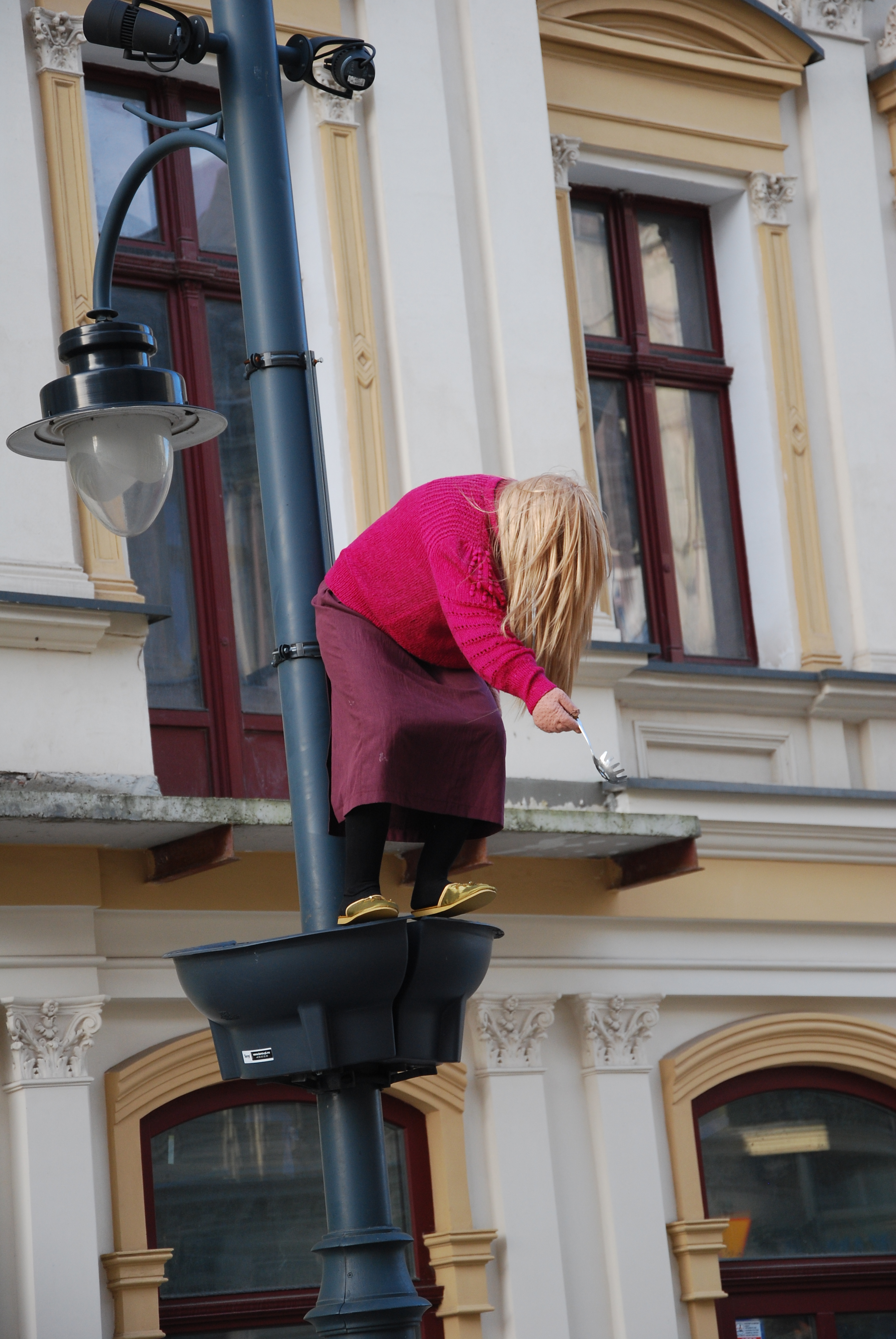
Street art (by Mark Jenkins)
