= Władysław Pieńkowski =

Polish official and mayor

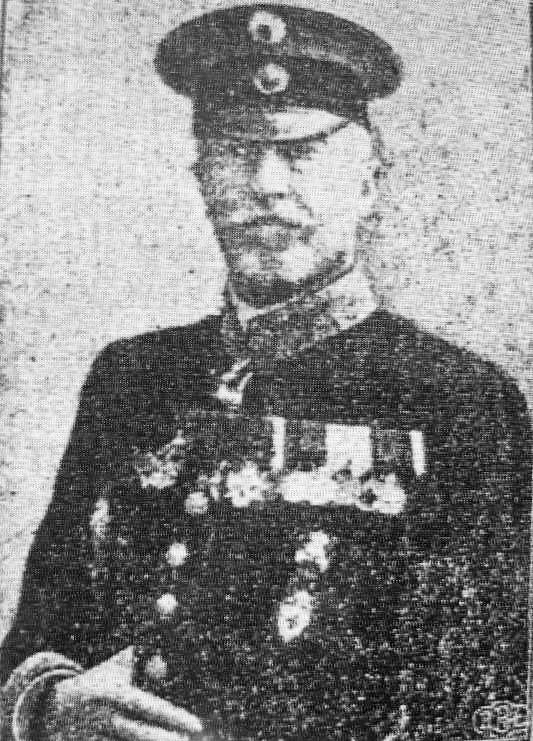

Mayor of Radomsko
- In office November 1874 – 1878

Mayor of Zgierz
- In office 1878–1882
- Succeeded by: Edward Ślósarski

Mayor of Łódź
- In office 22 November 1882 – 5 August 1914
- Preceded by: Walerian Michał Makowiecki
- Succeeded by: Alfred Biedermann

Personal details
- Born: 23 April 1846 Piotrków Trybunalski
- Died: 5 July 1919 (aged 73) Warsaw
- Awards: Order of Saint Anna (2nd and 3rd Class); Order of Saint Stanislaus (2nd and 3rd Class); Order of Saint Vladimir (4th Class); Medal for the Suppression of the Polish Rebellion

Władysław Pieńkowski (23 April 1846 – 5 July 1919) was a Polish official who served as Mayor of Radomsko (1874–1878), Zgierz (1878–1882), and Łódź (1882–1914).

== Biography ==
Władysław Pieńkowski was born on 23 April 1846 in Piotrków Trybunalski, then part of Congress Poland, to a peasant family, Józefat and Anna née Bledzewska, who owned a farm in Witów, Piotrków Governorate. On 21 May 1846, he was baptized in the Catholic Church at the Church of St. James in Piotrków, receiving the names Władysław Wojciech. Later in life, he converted to Eastern Orthodoxy. His godparents were Seweryn Grabiński, a former Polish army officer, and Antonina Jasińska, assisted by Tomasz Jasiński and Franciszka Grabińska.

He completed four years at a Russian-German primary school and attended a commercial school. He then apprenticed in Warsaw at a colonial goods store owned by Leon Krupecki before moving to Łódź during the January Uprising of 1863. According to the Pamiatnaja kniżka Pietrokowskoj gubiernii na 1904 god, he graduated from the Higher Craft School in Łódź.

=== Early career ===
On 24 July 1863, Pieńkowski began working as a clerk in the Łódź Magistrate with an annual salary of 100 rubles. On 8 February 1864, he was assigned to the office of the city's military commander, Colonel Baron Alexander von Broemsen, a German hostile to Poles. He served there until the uprising's suppression, earning the Medal for the Suppression of the Polish Rebellion on 18 December 1864. From 28 September 1866, he was an assistant police inspector, and on 3 June 1867, he became Łódź's quartermaster, earning 180 rubles annually.

He later worked in Zgierz's city office, quickly advancing to secretary of the Quartering Department. In November 1874, he became Mayor of Radomsko, and in 1878, Mayor of Zgierz, with a salary of 750 rubles. In August 1878, while still mayor of Radomsko, he received the Order of Saint Stanislaus, 3rd Class.

=== Mayor of Łódź ===
On 9 November 1882, Pieńkowski substituted for the ailing Walerian Michał Makowiecki, assuming the presidency of Łódź on 22 November after Makowiecki's death. He inherited a financially robust city: in 1882, revenues were 113,725 rubles and 31.5 kopecks, expenditures were 80,818 rubles and 1.5 kopecks, with a reserve fund of 232,120 rubles and 87.5 kopecks in the Bank of Poland.

==== Developments during presidency ====
During Władysław Pieńkowski's presidency, Łódź did experience rapid development; however, this was primarily the result of a global civilizational leap and the significant involvement of private capital and the activity of local entrepreneurs, rather than the initiative or dedication of the mayor.

In December 1883, the first telephone connection was launched in the city. Starting in September 1885, an address reform was carried out, introducing a new numbering system for properties on each street and dividing street buildings into sides with even and odd numbers. In October 1886, the first state-run Russian-language boys' and girls' gymnasiums were opened (they are the predecessors of today's Tadeusz Kościuszko High School No. III and Emilia Sczaniecka High School No. IV), and in 1906, the Polish Boys' Gymnasium of the Uczelnia Society was established (now Nicolaus Copernicus High School No. I). On 6 January 1884, the first issue of Dziennik Łódzki appeared – the first Polish newspaper in Łódź published entirely in the Polish language.

In the last three decades of the 19th century and the early years of the 20th century, industry developed rapidly. Among others, the following factories were established: the Schwartz, Birnbaum et Co. wool products factory at 2/6 Tylna Street (1884), the worsted wool products factory of Paul Desurmont at 219/221 Wólczańska Street, and the cotton spinning mill of Henryk Grohman at Emilia Street – now 22/24 Wincenty Tymieniecki Street (1889).

Starting in 1884, electric lighting began to be introduced – initially in factories, and later also on city streets: in the private Meyer Passage – now Stanisław Moniuszko Street (1887), and at the New Market – now Liberty Square (1908). In December 1898, the first electric tram service in Congress Poland was launched. At the end of 1902, the Łódź Kaliska railway station was opened for use, and in July 1903, a new post office building was inaugurated at 38 Przejazd Street (now Julian Tuwim Street).

Hospitals were opened: in 1884, at the Karl Wilhelm Scheibler factories (currently the Karol Jonscher Municipal Hospital at 14 Milionowa Street); in 1897, the factory hospital of the Russian Red Cross at Pańska Street (now University Clinical Hospital No. 2 of the Medical University of Łódź at 113 Stefan Żeromski Street); in 1902, the Hospital for the Mentally and Nervously Ill "Kochanówka" (now the Józef Babiński Specialist Psychiatric Healthcare Facility at 159 Aleksandrowska Street); and in 1905, the Anna Maria Children's Hospital at Rokicińska Street (now the Janusz Korczak Pediatric Center at 71 Józef Piłsudski Avenue). In 1899, the city ambulance service was established.

Bank buildings were constructed on Spacerowa Street (now Tadeusz Kościuszko Avenue): the Russian State Bank (1905–1908) at number 14 and the Commercial Bank at number 15. Hotels were also established: in 1887, the "Grand" at 72 Piotrkowska Street (following the reconstruction of Ludwik Meyer's factory building); between 1909 and 1911, the "Savoy" at Krótka Street (now at 6 Romuald Traugutt Street); and between 1910 and 1912, the "Palast" at Dzielna Street (now Hotel Polonia Palast at 38 Gabriel Narutowicz Street).

In 1887, the Great Synagogue was opened at the intersection of Spacerowa and Dzielna streets (now 2 Tadeusz Kościuszko Avenue/8 Zielona Street). Churches were also built, including the Church of the Assumption (1888–1897) and the current Łódź Cathedral (1901–1912); additionally, construction of the Evangelical-Augsburg St. Matthew's Church began in 1909.

In 1896, a new cemetery complex was established in the Doły district. Public parks were also arranged: in 1899, the Mikołajewski Municipal Garden (now Henryk Sienkiewicz Park), in 1902, the Municipal Garden (now Stanisław Staszic Park), and in 1910, the garden on Pańska Street (now Józef Poniatowski Park). Mayor Pieńkowski also commissioned the engineering of the Łódka river and the drafting of a municipal water supply and sewage system project.

The two largest sports clubs in Łódź were established – ŁKS Łódź in 1908, and Widzew Łódź two years later, in 1910.

Pieńkowski received the Order of Saint Stanislaus, 2nd Class, in July 1886, and became chairman of the Łódź Russian Red Cross Society committee in 1889, replacing the outgoing president A. Tumski. On 5 August 1889, he was recognized as a chinovnik, and in November, he was appointed court councillor (equivalent to the rank of lieutenant colonel in military service). He received the Order of Saint Anna, 2nd Class, on 7 July 1890.

In 1895, responding to the Tsarist authorities' intention to restore municipal coats of arms in Congress Poland, Pieńkowski prepared and submitted a report in which he stated that Łódź had never had a coat of arms and that there was no evidence of its existence in the city's records. He attached to the report a proposed coat of arms for Łódź, created according to his own guidelines (with the participation of honorary members of the magistrate) by city architect Franciszek Chełmiński. Since the proposed coat of arms was entirely unlike those typically found in Polish municipal heraldry, the attempt to officially introduce it met with strong resistance. Particularly vocal was Wiktor Czajewski, who in 1903 announced a competition for a new design in his newspaper Rozwój. It was then that historian Jan Karol Kochanowski discovered impressions of the city seal from 1577 – bearing the Old Polish coat of arms of Łódź – in the Citizenship Land Registers of Łódź from 1775 to 1818. Czajewski immediately sent copies of the seal to Piotrków Governor Konstantin Miller, which offended Pieńkowski. In response, Pieńkowski submitted a report to the same governor accusing Czajewski and his newspaper of undermining the policies of the Tsarist authorities, the authority of municipal officials, and even that of the Emperor of Russia. Following this denunciation, Miller sent a letter titled On the unlawful actions of the Łódź newspaper "Rozwój" to Namiestnik Mikhail Chertkov, and the tone of this letter led to a decision to suspend the competition for a new coat of arms for Łódź.

At the end of September 1896, the Piotrków-based Tydzień reported on a decision by Pieńkowski regarding the foundlings left on the streets of Łódź – they were placed with poor families who received compensation of 5 rubles per month for their care. It was emphasized that the infants were regularly visited by the city physician, who, along with the mayor, oversaw their needs.

At the turn of the 19th and 20th centuries, dissatisfaction among Łódź workers was growing due to poor working conditions and low wages. Schoolchildren were demanding an end to Russification. In May 1892, a six-day general strike broke out in Łódź, later known as the Łódź rebellion, which ended with a bloody intervention by the Tsarist army and police. In 1905, following a series of strikes, an insurrection erupted in June, which was similarly suppressed with violence by the Tsarist authorities within three days. These events, however, did not undermine Władysław Pieńkowski's presidency. It was only the outbreak of World War I that brought it to an end.

==== Assessment of presidency ====
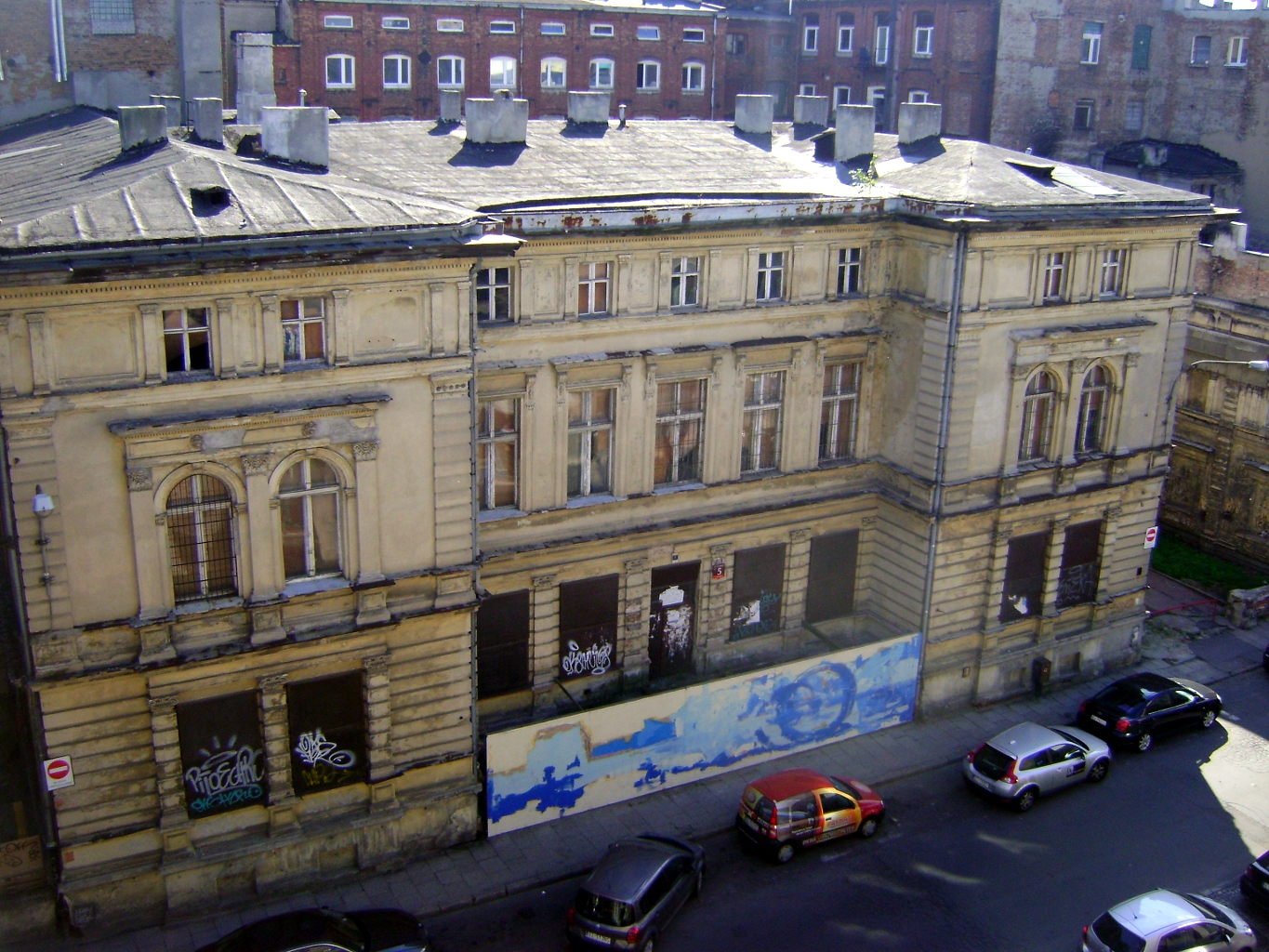
Trianon Villa at Meyer's Passage (now 5 Stanisław Moniuszko Street), Pieńkowski's residence (December 2012)

Pieńkowski, Łódź's longest-serving mayor, governed for nearly 32 years. When he began, Łódź had 96,863 residents (49,592 permanent); by 1914, it neared 477,862 (213,564 permanent). His salary rose from 1,000 rubles in 1882 to 4,700 in 1904. He lived in a nine-room apartment in Trianon Villa, built in 1877 by Ludwik Meyer at the then-private 514aa Meyer Passage (after the address reform, number 5, now 5 Stanisław Moniuszko Street), which the city council rented from the owner for 1,600 rubles per year. He attained the rank of Active State Councillor (equivalent to the rank of major general in military service) and was a class VI official.

The rapid development of Łódź – the years from 1870 to 1900 marked the most intensive period of industrial expansion in the city's history – occurred primarily thanks to the initiative of the entrepreneurs operating there, and only to a small extent was it the merit of the city mayor, whose rule was even described as a dictatorship. Władysław Pieńkowski was highly reluctant to approve expenditures from the city treasury for purposes related to urban development, despite the fact that the available funds sometimes amounted to as much as 1.5 million rubles. These resources were therefore used only to meet the most essential municipal needs, while Pieńkowski treated most of the money as a reserve, mainly for military needs. He made use of it, for example, during the 1905 revolution, when the acting military commander of Łódź – Governor General Nikolai Kaznakov – began suppressing the revolutionary movement. In 1909, however, Pieńkowski did not grant approval (justifying his decision with a lack of funds) for the city budget to finance the purchase of land near the former Milsch forester's lodge, which blocked the possibility of extending the tram line along Milsch Street (now Mikołaj Kopernik Street) from the center of Łódź to the Łódź Kaliska railway station, opened six years earlier. Despite the tram network having existed for over 10 years, the station remained cut off from the rest of the city (the line was extended only in October 1913).

According to the prevailing opinion of his contemporaries, Pieńkowski served the interests of the military authorities, the gendarmerie, and the Orthodox clergy, and was also unfavorably disposed toward Poles. One source attributed to him the intention, while working in the office of the military commander of the city of Łódź during the January Uprising, to cut down all the forests surrounding the city so that insurgents would have no place to hide. However, it was likely the idea of Colonel von Broemsen himself, who also hoped to profit from the sale of the timber. The plan remained unrealized. In the opinion of the governor of Piotrków, Pieńkowski was an official "with a good reputation, capable, and fully loyal to the government".

On the day of the imperial train crash in the Kharkov Governorate, 29 October 1888, President Pieńkowski sent the following letter to Viceroy Iosif Gurko, requesting that it be "laid at the feet of their imperial majesties":

YOUR IMPERIAL MAJESTY!

It has pleased the Most Beneficent Providence to preserve the precious life of YOUR IMPERIAL MAJESTY, YOUR MOST SERENE CONSORT, and the entire IMPERIAL FAMILY, and to save Russia from an inexpressible tragedy and disaster. Horrified by the dreadful calamity that has passed, we, the loyal subjects and residents of the city of Łódź, raising our grateful prayers to the Almighty, hasten to lay at the feet of YOUR IMPERIAL MAJESTY, our adored MONARCH, the sentiments of boundless love and the most sincere loyal devotion.

Firmly believing that Almighty God will continue to protect His ANOINTED from all misfortunes, our hearts join those of all loyal subjects in prayer to God, and our lips repeat the single cry shared by all of Russia: long live the RUSSIAN EMPEROR and HIS MOST NOBLE FAMILY, and may God preserve THEM for many long years.

President of the city of Łódź

(signed) Pieńkowski

Władysław Pieńkowski was well acquainted with Tsar Nicholas II and was received several times in imperial audiences in Tsarskoye Selo and Saint Petersburg. On 7 October 1901, during a formal dinner held at the Romanov residence in Spała on the occasion of the consecration of the Church of St. Nicholas in nearby Tomaszów Mazowiecki, the tsar greeted him with the question: "Is this not the nth time we've met already?".

In 1902, Nikodem Justyn Sobocki – then an employee of the city magistrate – believed that Pieńkowski and Secretary Yegorov were pulling all the strings in the city, including controlling the officials, and that the mayor was largely acting under the influence of Vasily Yegorov. Pieńkowski's subservience toward the higher Russian authorities did not go unnoticed – he was "showered with orders and various medals".

After 30 years of President Pieńkowski's administration, the number of Russian officials in the Łódź magistrate rose from 1 to 38. In 1911, he wrote to Piotrków Governor Mikhail Yachevsky:

These figures speak for themselves and clearly show my attitude toward the composition of officials of Russian origin. My entire long-standing and impeccable public service is known to all; everyone is aware of my consistently active attitude toward everything that is called Russian – I consider this a particular great honour and sacred duty.

The figure of Władysław Pieńkowski was remembered by his contemporary, the Łódź writer, journalist, and publicist Stanisław Rachalewski, whose childhood and early youth coincided with the last 14 years of Pieńkowski's presidency:

[...] I myself well remember that proud, haughty figure, clad in a uniform with gilded buttons, wearing a light blouse during the sweltering summer and navy trousers with piping. He strolled almost daily through the New Market (today's Freedom Square). He walked with his head held high, holding a riding crop in his hand. The moment Pieńkowski appeared – which usually happened between 12 and 1 o'clock – the street he customarily walked down would immediately empty. Everyone moved off the sidewalk into the road. [...]

President Pieńkowski had also been recalled earlier, in 1933, by Mieczysław Hertz – a Łódź industrialist, historian, and social activist – who referred to his panicked flight after the outbreak of World War I:

[...] A man without any education, a Pole by birth, servant and footstool of the Russian authorities, a man who did very little for the development of the city, failing to understand the needs which, amid the frenzied growth of Łódź, grew every year as they went unmet – this man fled in panic just at the moment when self-government was spontaneously forming. [...]

According to modern historians, Władysław Pieńkowski's presidency was marked by the progressive Russification of the city magistrate and significant budgetary savings for the benefit of the state (then the Russian Empire), at the expense of addressing the urgent needs of the city and its several hundred thousand inhabitants. His attitude toward the Tsarist authorities is described as "decidedly loyalist".

=== Post-presidency ===
Shortly after the outbreak of World War I, Pieńkowski left Łódź together with the retreating Russian troops, although for a long time there was uncertainty as to the exact date of his departure: whether he was among the first to leave, already on 3 August 1914 or on 4 August 1914 (when the evacuation of state institutions and their staff took place, as well as the departure of the Russian 10th Artillery Regiment from the city), or only on 9 August 1914. According to the latest findings by Aneta Stawiszyńska, between 3 August and 29 September 1914, Pieńkowski left the city and returned to it several times. His first absence, lasting a few days, began on 3 August 1914, and shortly before that the president handed over the amount of 200,000 rubles from the city treasury to the Citizens' Committee of Łódź.

One source states that on 4 August at 8:00 PM, Pieńkowski, as honorary chairman, opened the general organisational meeting of the Citizens' Committee of the City of Łódź, which took place in the hall of the People's House of the Christian Workers' Association at 34 Przejazd Street (now Julian Tuwim Street). Another source, however, claims that the Citizens' Committee of Łódź was created precisely due to the flight of the city's mayor, meaning he must have left before the general meeting took place. According to Aneta Stawiszyńska, the Main Citizens' Committee of the City of Łódź had offered Pieńkowski the chairmanship of the meeting, but since he declined (citing numerous duties), it was decided to name him honorary chairman – a role that likely did not require his physical presence at the gathering.

Pieńkowski's next departure from the city took place on 9 August 1914, at which time councillor Józef Mirecki was appointed his deputy. The State Archive in Łódź holds a telegram dated 13 September 1914, which reads:

In supplement to my report of 28 July of this year, I respectfully inform Your Excellency that on 27 July of this year, at approximately 4 in the afternoon, the Police Chief of the City of Łódź, Captain Czesnakov, informed me by telephone that Your Excellency had ordered me, due to wartime circumstances, to leave the City of Łódź, which was executed on the same day. I am currently residing in Warsaw at 47A Piękna Street.

Mayor of the City of Łódź

Pieńkowski

Pieńkowski returned briefly to Łódź again on 16 August 1914. According to Mieczysław Hertz, he made another short visit toward the end of August, although he did not resume his official duties. Aneta Stawiszyńska dates that return to 26 August 1914. Soon afterward, Pieńkowski left the city again together with the Russian police upon hearing of the Russian defeat at the Battle of Tannenberg. He returned once more on 31 August 1914 to formally hand over the administration of the city to the Main Citizens' Committee and his deputy, Józef Mirecki. His final departure from Łódź during the war occurred on 29 September 1914, when he officially delegated his duties to councillor Jan Andrzejewski.

His later fate is not fully known. It is confirmed that he travelled from Warsaw to Moscow. He returned to Łódź in October 1918 or, according to another account, after the October Revolution in November 1918, burdened with debt. He relied on donations from acquaintances – some of his debts were repaid by Łódź industrialists – and also appealed to the municipal government for assistance. After being refused, he left once again for Warsaw, where he died, paralyzed and in poverty, on 5 July 1919. He was buried at Powązki Cemetery.

== Family ==
Pieńkowski married a Lutheran woman, and they had one daughter, born in 1882, who died on 12 December 1886 and was buried in Zgierz.

== Awards ==
- Medal for the Suppression of the Polish Rebellion (1864)
- Order of Saint Stanislaus, 3rd Class (1878)
- Order of Saint Anna, 3rd Class (before 1886)
- Order of Saint Stanislaus, 2nd Class (1886)
- Order of Saint Anna, 2nd Class (1890)
- Order of Saint Vladimir, 4th Class (1896)
- Medal in Commemoration of the Reign of Alexander III (silver)
- Medal for the Coronation of Their Imperial Majesties (silver)
- Medal for the First General Census of 1897 (bronze)
- Russian Red Cross Badge (twice)
- Two golden signet rings (one with ruby and diamonds, one with a diamond) and a gold cigarette case with diamonds and the Russian state emblem.

== Bibliography ==
- Stawiszyńska, Aneta (2016). Łódź w latach I wojny światowej [Łódź During World War I] (in Polish). Oświęcim: Napoleon V. ISBN 978-83-65495-27-3.
- Wojalski, Mirosław Zbigniew (1996). Kieszonkowa kronika dziejów Łodzi [Pocket Chronicle of Łódź History] (in Polish) (1st ed.). Łódź: ZORA. ISBN 83-86699-07-8.
