= Stanisław Moniuszko Street =

Street in Łódź, Poland

- Meyer's Passage
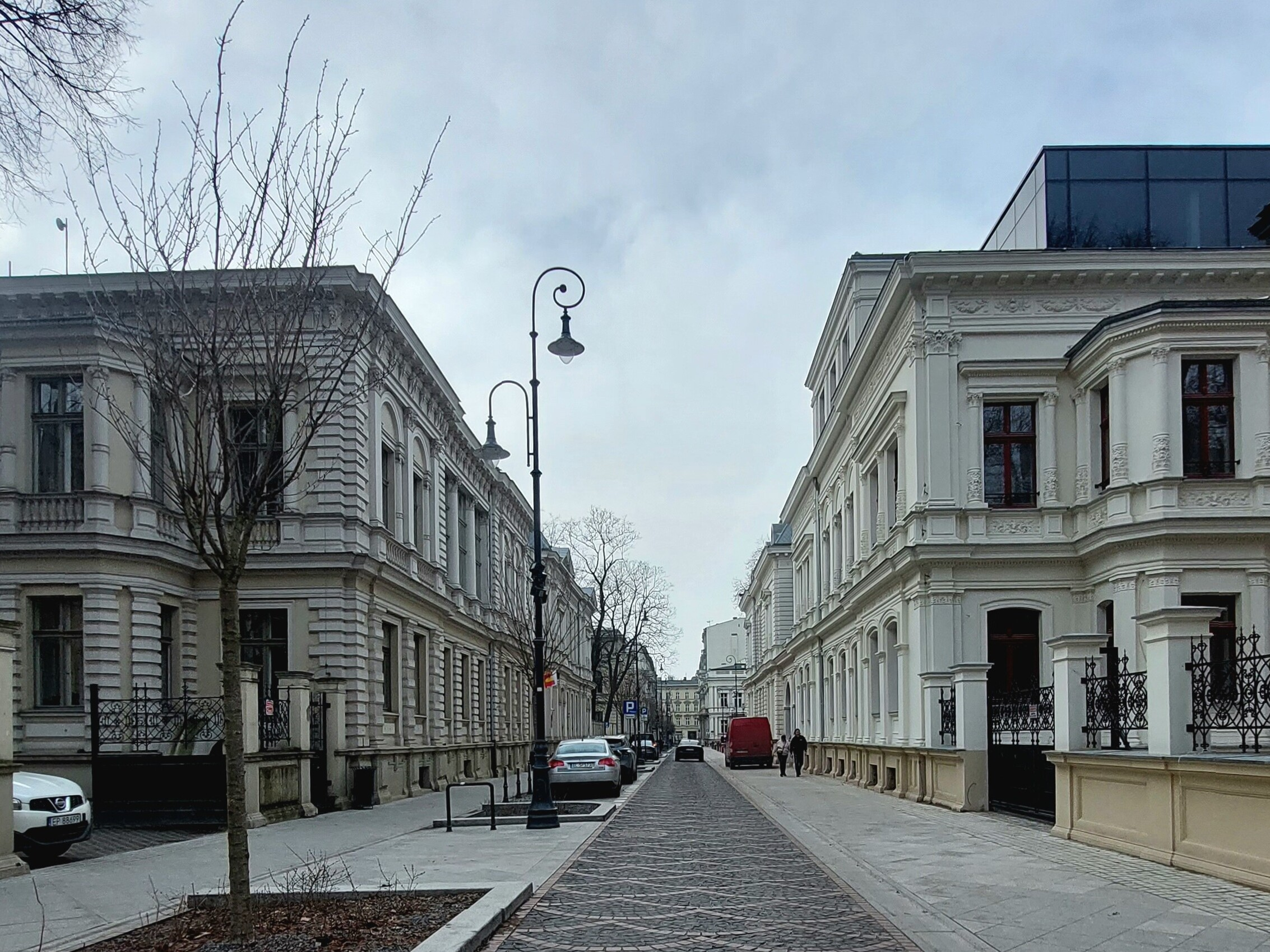
- Stanisław Moniuszko Street
- Interactive map of Stanisław Moniuszko Street
- Part of: Łódź City Center
- Length: 0.3 km (0.19 mi)
- Location: Łódź, Poland
- Coordinates: 51°46′05.5″N 19°27′32″E
- From: Piotrkowska Street
- Major junctions: Hotelowa Street (100 m)
- To: Henryk Sienkiewicz Street

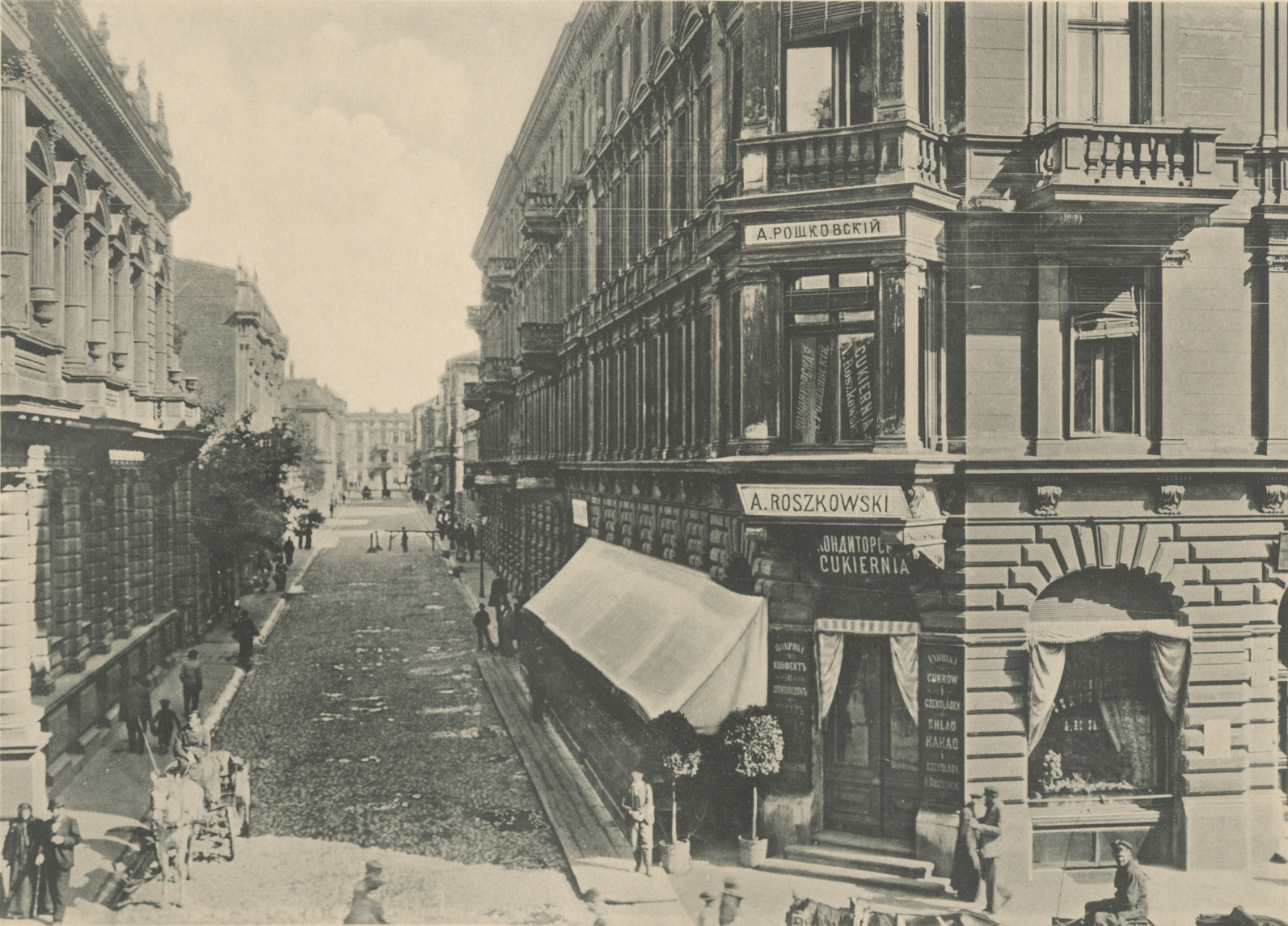
Meyer's Passage, 1896

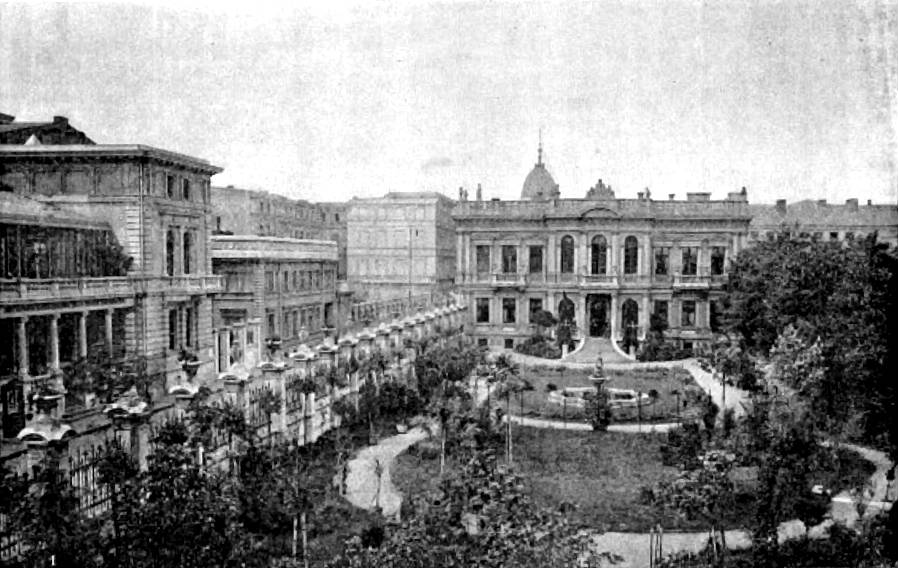
Ludwik Meyer's villa at 4 Stanisław Moniuszko Street

Stanisław Moniuszko Street, historically known as Meyer's Passage, is a 0.3-kilometre street in the Śródmieście district of Łódź, Poland, within the Łódź City Center area of the Łódź Municipal Information System. This street, originally a private passage developed by Ludwik Meyer, features Renaissance Revival villas designed by architect Hilary Majewski. It runs almost parallel to the equator, connecting Piotrkowska Street to Henryk Sienkiewicz Street.

Located entirely within Łódź's tourist-historical zone, the street's urban ensemble is listed in the register of historic monuments. It operates as a two-way traffic road (as of February 2017). Until 11 September 2002, it was classified as a county road, but its status was downgraded to a municipal road by Resolution No. LXXXVI/1902/02 of the Łódź City Council. The street lies within the boundaries of the Parish of the Exaltation of the Holy Cross.

== History ==
Spanning 300 metres, Meyer's Passage was likely the second private street in Łódź. The first was probably Solna Street (formerly Saltzmańska or Salcmanowska), owned by Jewish merchant Samuel Jechezkiel Saltzman, who received gubernatorial approval for its construction in 1863. Partially closed to public traffic (pedestrian access was unrestricted, but the passage was closed to horse-drawn carriages and carts; some sources indicate passage was possible upon payment), it linked Piotrkowska Street with Dzika Street (later Mikołajewska Street, now Henryk Sienkiewicz Street). The impetus for its creation was a rumour in the early 1880s about relocating the Piotrków Governorate capital from Piotrków Trybunalski to Łódź. Ludwik Meyer aimed to build residences for tsarist authorities, receiving municipal approval in May 1885. Although the capital relocation did not occur, the street was constructed, earning praise as Łódź's most beautiful street in a mid-1895 article in the Piotrków-based Tydzień.

The houses were equipped with gas and water-sewer systems. The roadway was paved with wooden cobbles to reduce carriage noise, and the sidewalks were lined with sandstone slabs. The passage housed Łódź's elite, including mayor Władysław Pieńkowski, lawyer Henryk Elzenberg, and industrialist Zygmunt Jarociński. At 5 Stanisław Moniuszko Street, Bronisław Wilkoszewski operated a photographic studio. Ludwik Meyer resided at number 4 in a villa with a grand garden until 1901, where the YMCA building, still standing in 2017, was later constructed in the 1930s.

In early 1887, the passage became Łódź's first street with electric lighting. Each house and garden was illuminated, powered by a dynamo in the basement of number 3. From 1 July 1888 until its suspension in late 1892, the editorial office and printing house of Dziennik Łódzki, the city's oldest Polish-language newspaper, operated at 9 Stanisław Moniuszko Street (formerly plot 514c). A columnist wrote shortly after the move:

[…] Above us, the scientific directorate; opposite, an insurance company, an industrial association, a telegraph, and a post office; to the left, a restaurant; and to the right, something must be there too. Sun rays by day, beams of electric light by night. Wherever you look – beautiful flowers or women, which amounts to the same. This is Meyer's Passage, our new home for a week! […]

In 1905 or 1906, Meyer's Passage was transferred to city management at no cost, becoming a public street. By 1937, it was connected to the municipal sewer system, and the roadway was repaved with asphalt. During World War II, the German occupiers renamed it Dietrich-Eckart-Straße in 1940, after a German journalist and early Nazi Party leader. From 1948 to 1975, the ground floor of the building at 2 Stanisław Moniuszko Street housed the private Honoratka Café, a meeting place for Łódź's bohemian circle, particularly filmmakers and students of the National Film School.

From 2011 to 2013, the street recorded no traffic accidents, making it entirely safe for road users. The street featured illuminations during the Light Move Festival organized by the Łódź-based Lux Pro Monumentis Foundation on 19–21 October 2012 (2nd edition), 10–12 October 2014 (4th edition), 9–11 October 2015 (5th edition), and 7–9 October 2016 (6th edition). In 2014, city authorities decided to revitalize the street, transforming it into a woonerf (shared urban space) and adapting the Trianon Villa at number 5 and the adjacent building at number 3 into a "Mediateka" – a multimedia centre and library. Plans also considered reinstating wooden cobblestone paving, reminiscent of the 19th century. Originally scheduled for completion in 2017, the project was delayed to 2018. Additionally, plans to connect Stanisław Moniuszko Street meridionally with Julian Tuwim Street by breaking through the block between the Trianon Villa and the villa at 7/9 were proposed for completion by 2018. After project revisions, the revitalization was rescheduled for autumn 2021.

In 2015, the street was designated a Historic Monument.

=== Former institutions ===
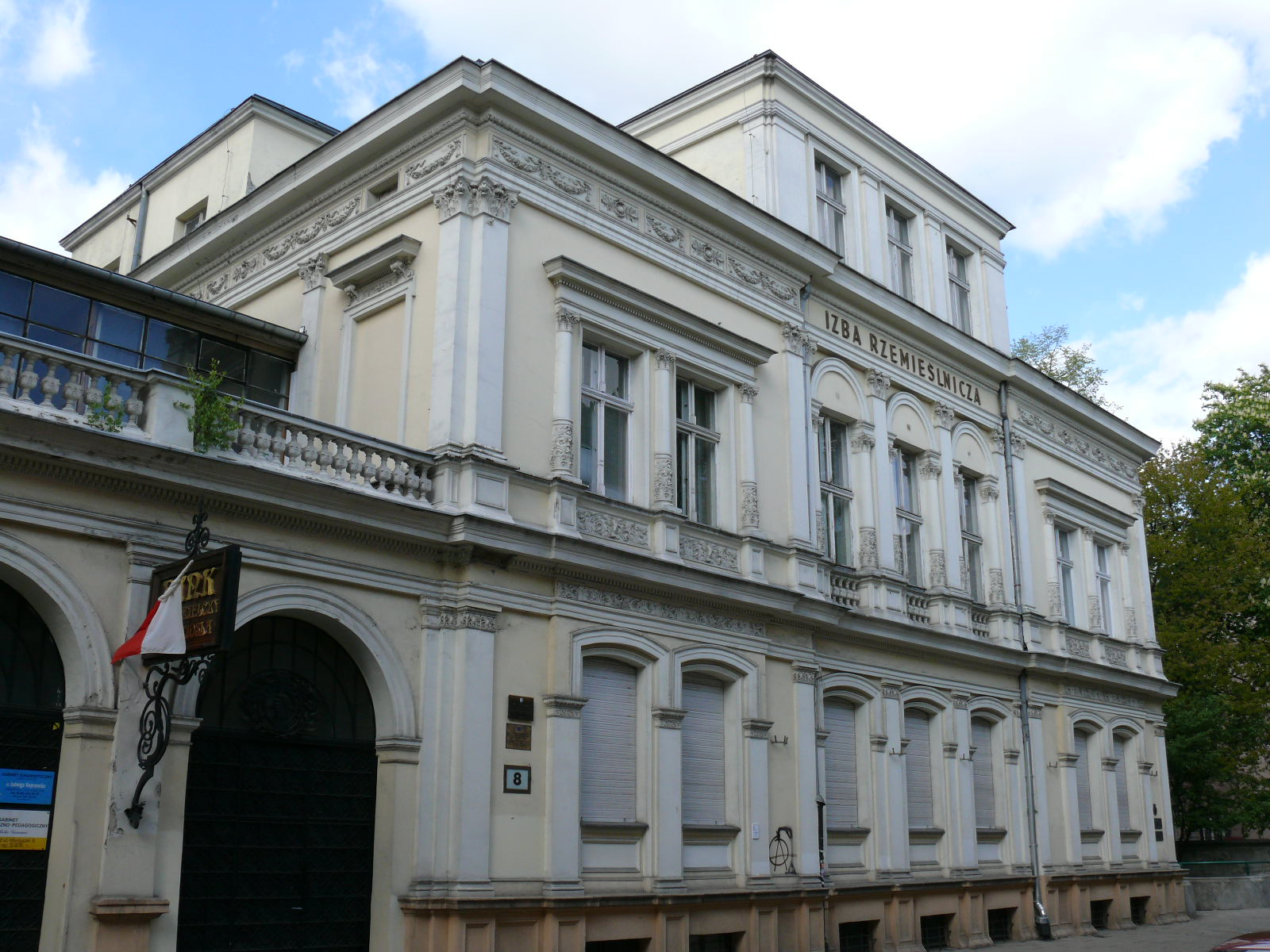
Villa at 8 Stanisław Moniuszko Street

Before World War II, several institutions were headquartered on Stanisław Moniuszko Street:

- 1 – Lutnia Association; Zarzewie Independence Movement Participants' Association; Polish Reserve Officers' Union.
- 2 – Mutual Aid Fund for Non-Commissioned State Police and Lower State Officials.
- 3 – Federation of Polish Homeland Defenders' Unions; editorial office of Głos Rezerwisty; Reserve Officers' Union.
- 4 – Łódź 10 Post and Telecommunication Office.
- 4a – Łódź Branch of the Young Men's Christian Association Polish YMCA; Łódź District Chess Association.
- 5 – Łódź Manufacturers and Merchants Association, founded in 1913; National Textile Industry Union, founded in 1920; Łódź Cooperative Textile Bank; Polish Silk Fabrics Manufacturers' Association.
- 8 – Azov-Don Bank (workplace of Julian Tuwim's father and uncle Henryk Krukowski); Łódź Crafts Chamber; 7th State Police Commissariat.
- 9 – Łódź Civic Club.
- 10 – Łódź Cooperative Bank, founded in 1904; Łódź Mutual Credit Commercial-Industrial Association.

=== Notable residents ===
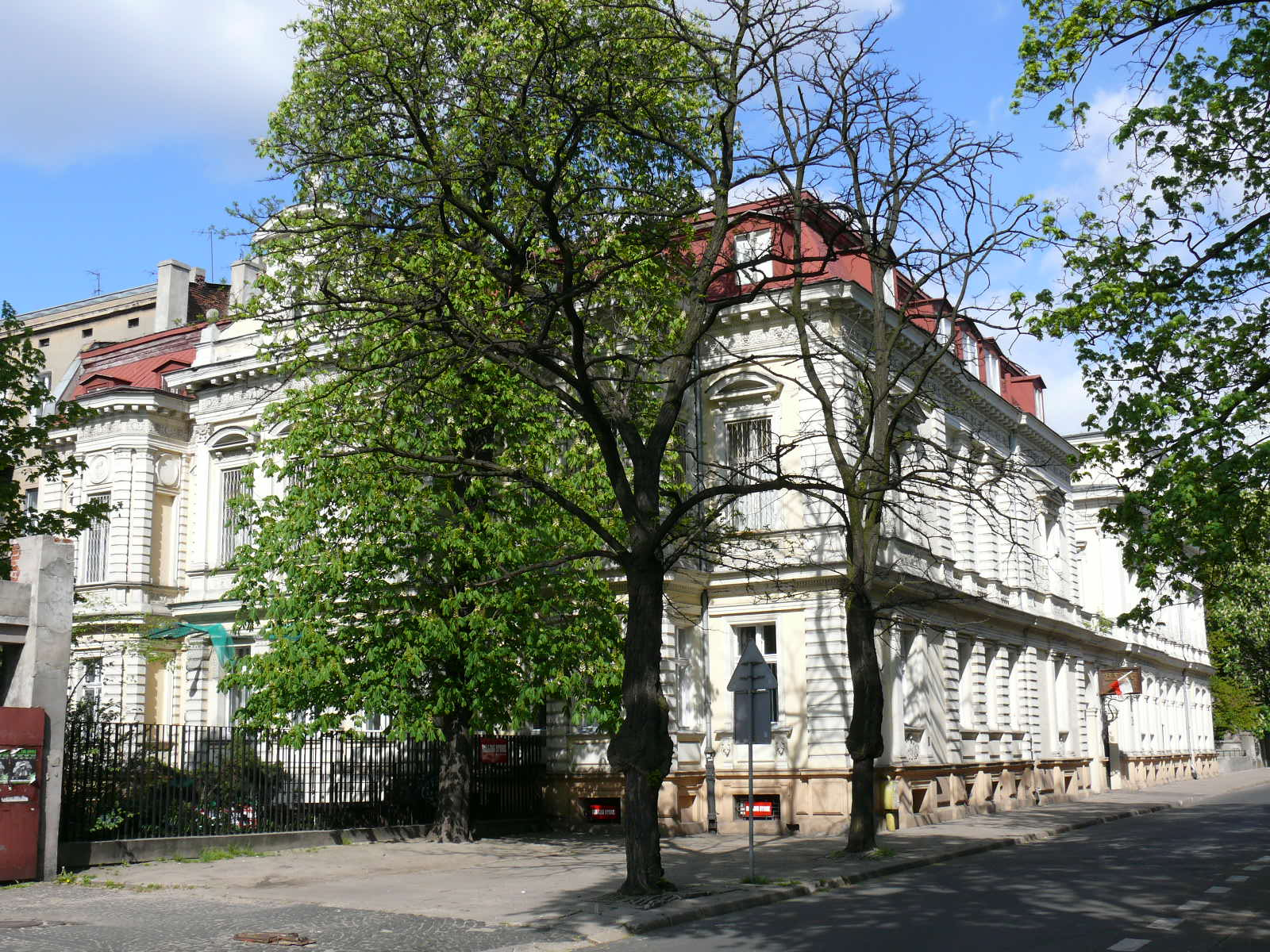
Villa at 6 Stanisław Moniuszko Street, home of Zygmunt Jarociński and family

- Henryk Elzenberg, lawyer and co-founder of Dziennik Łódzki – 514aa Meyer's Passage (later 5), 1880s–1890s.
- Zygmunt Jarociński, industrialist, with family – 512b Meyer's Passage (later 6), late 19th/early 20th century (paying 15,000 PLN annually for nine rooms).
- Stanisław Jarociński, industrialist – 6 Meyer's Passage.
- Władysław Pieńkowski, Łódź mayor (1882–1914) – 514aa Meyer's Passage (later 5), after 1882 (official residence rented by the municipality for 1,600 rubles annually).
- Ludwik Meyer, industrialist and passage creator – Meyer's Passage 512a (later 4), until 1901.
- Samuel Chinkes, insurance company director – 2 Stanisław Moniuszko Street, interwar period.
- Józef, Salomon, and Zygmunt Danziger, industrialists (Salomon owned a cotton spinning mill at 6/8 Kątna Street, now Walery Wróblewski Street, founded in 1919) – 10 Stanisław Moniuszko Street, interwar period.
- Jan Główczewski, judge at the Łódź District Court – 4a Stanisław Moniuszko Street, interwar period.
- Mieczysław Jazowski, bank director – 2 Stanisław Moniuszko Street, interwar period.
- Dawid Rozenblat, industrialist, owner of a spinning mill at 58 Przejazd Street (now 68 Julian Tuwim Street, founded in 1920) – 11 Stanisław Moniuszko Street, interwar period.
- Moszek Rozenblat, bank director – 11 Stanisław Moniuszko Street, interwar period.
- Majer Zylberszac, industrialist (cotton goods production and sales) – 2 Stanisław Moniuszko Street, interwar period.

=== Name changes timeline ===
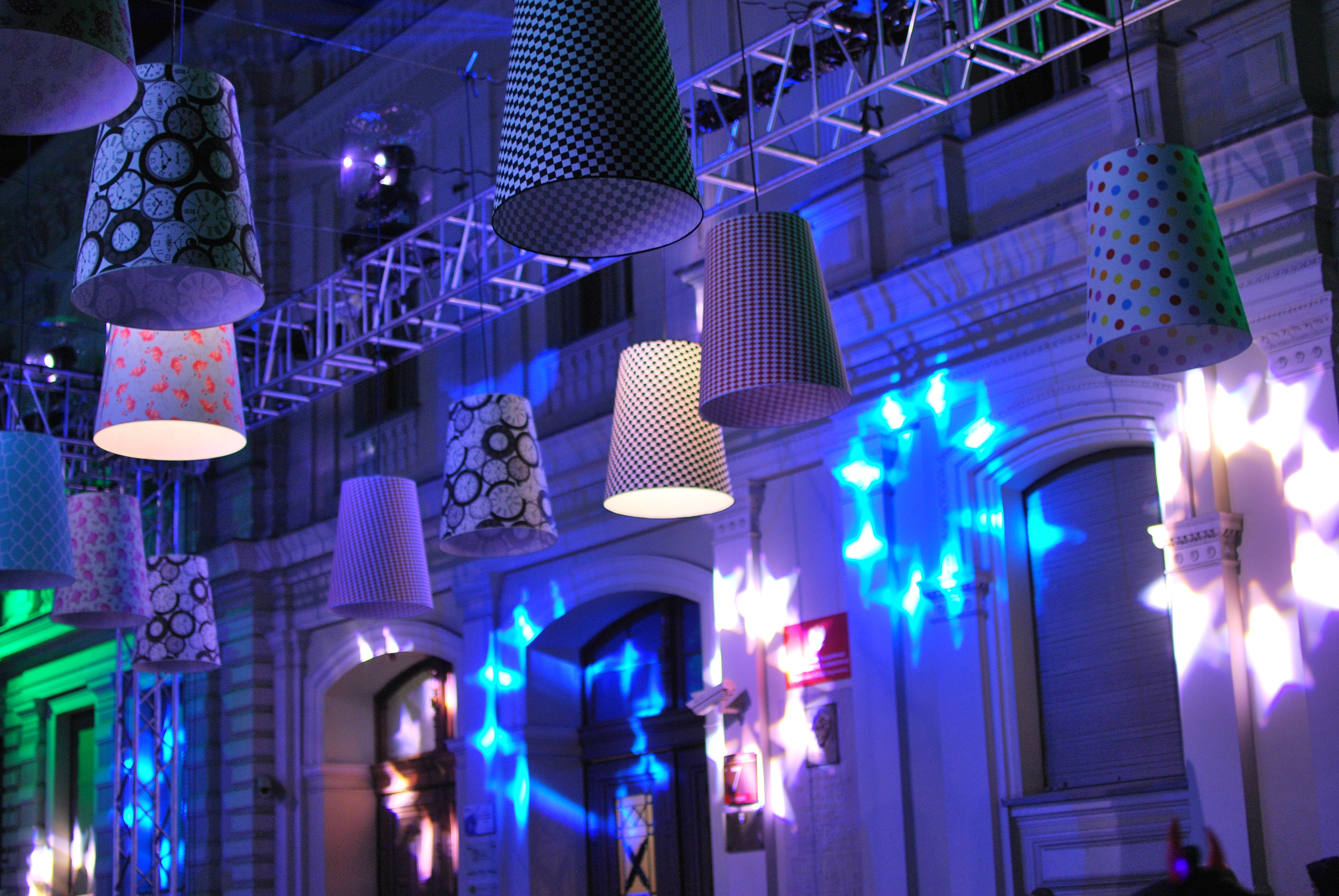
Stanisław Moniuszko Street during the 5th edition of Light Move Festival

Period	Name
1883–1915	Meyer's Passage / Пассажъ Майера
1915–1918	Meyers Zeile
1918–1919	Meyer's Passage
1919–1940	Stanisław Moniuszko Street
1940–1945	Dietrich Eckart Straße
1945–present	Stanisław Moniuszko Street

== In culture ==
=== In film ===
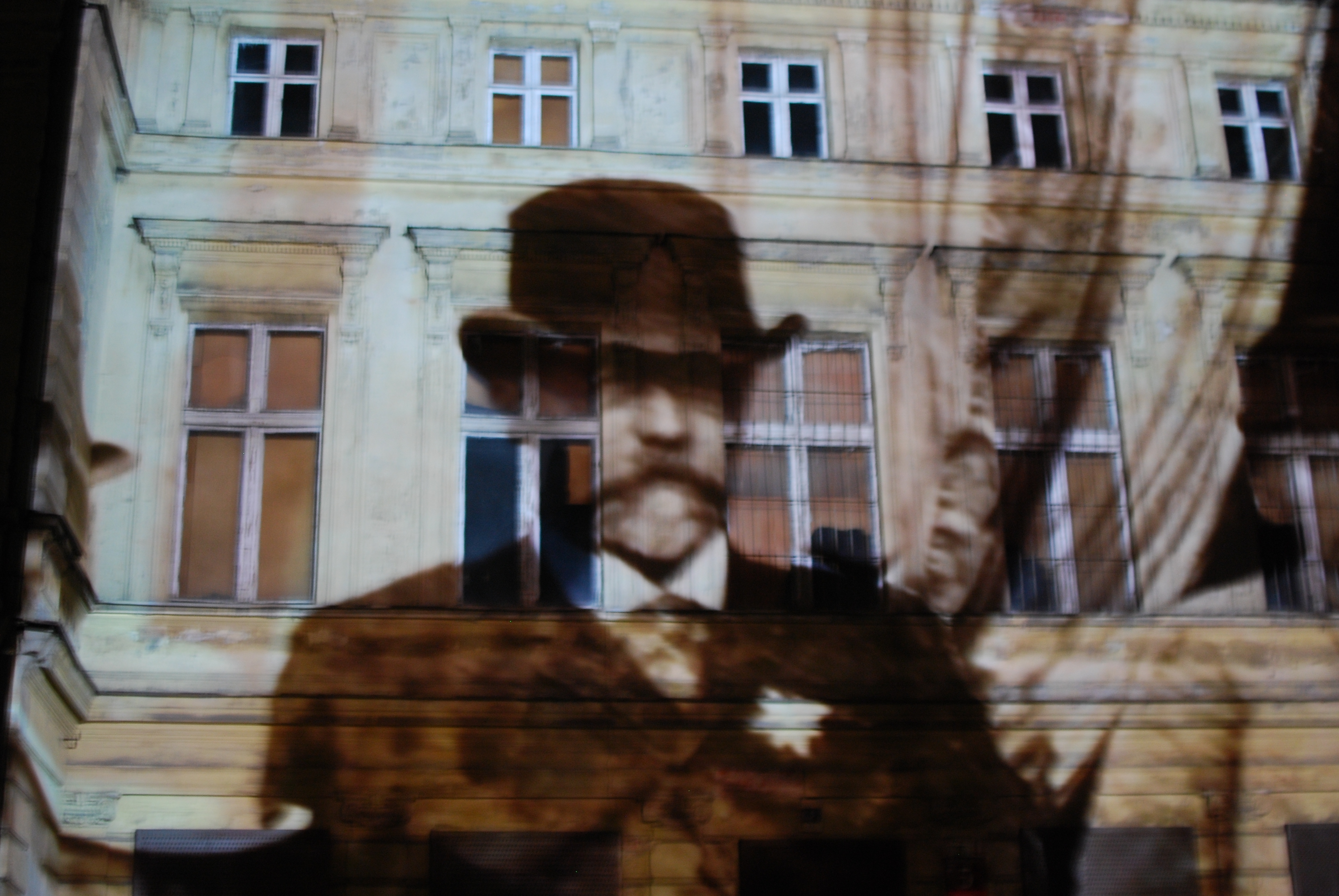
Festival projection during the 2nd edition of Light Move Festival on Stanisław Moniuszko Street

Stanisław Moniuszko Street has served as a filming location for numerous feature films and television series:

- Kalosze szczęścia (1958), directed by Antoni Bohdziewicz – the Honoratka Café portrayed a Munich funeral parlour.
- Bad Luck (1960), directed by Andrzej Munk – featured in Jan Piszczyk's dream sequence.
- Ich dzień powszedni (1963), directed by Aleksander Ścibor-Rylski.
- More Than Life At Stake (1967), episode 5, Ostatnia szansa, directed by Andrzej Konic – scenes in Honoratka Café, depicted as "Café Mocca".
- The Promised Land (1974, 1975), directed by Andrzej Wajda – a funeral procession scene for Herman Buchholz, with the street temporarily paved with cobbles to conceal the modern asphalt.
- Provincial Actors (1978), directed by Agnieszka Holland – the YMCA building (then Julian Tuwim Youth Palace) portrayed a provincial theatre.
- Kariera Nikodema Dyzmy (1980), directed by Jan Rybkowski and Marek Nowicki – Nikodem Dyzma's apartment, the Food Bank entrance, and the Splendid cinema entrance at number 1.
- Vabank (1981), directed by Juliusz Machulski.
- Komediantka (1986, 1987), directed by Jerzy Sztwiertnia.
- Porno (1989), directed by Marek Koterski – Aga (Iwona Katarzyna Pawlak) picks up Michał (Zbigniew Rola) by taxi outside the YMCA.
- Bodo (2016), directed by Michał Kwieciński and Michał Rosa.

=== In music ===
The street's name appears as the first in the third verse of the song Łódź from the album _NOT_ by the band Not, released in 2007 by 2.47 Records.

== Notable buildings ==
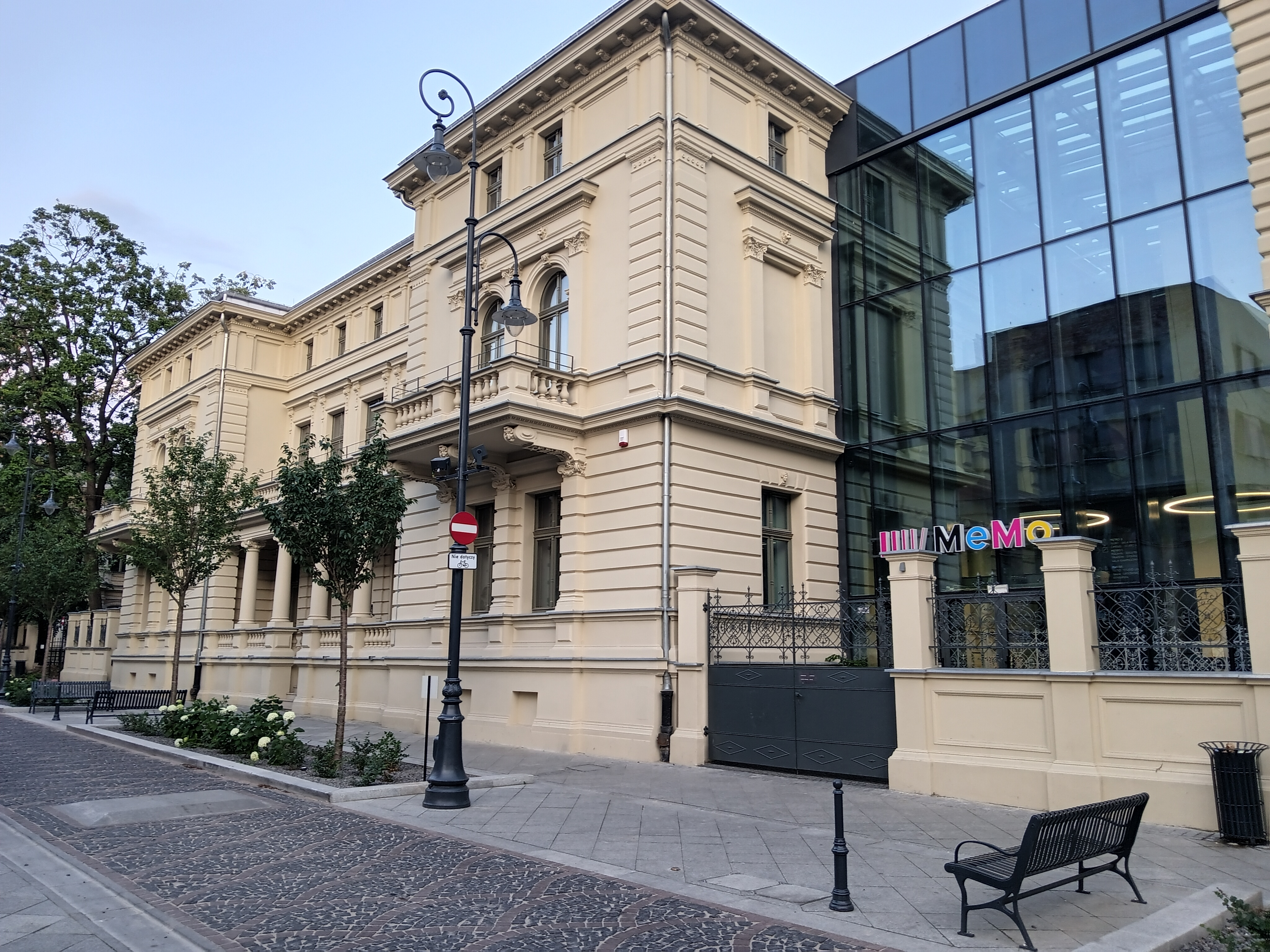
Trianon Villa at 5 Stanisław Moniuszko Street. Now Mediateka MeMo

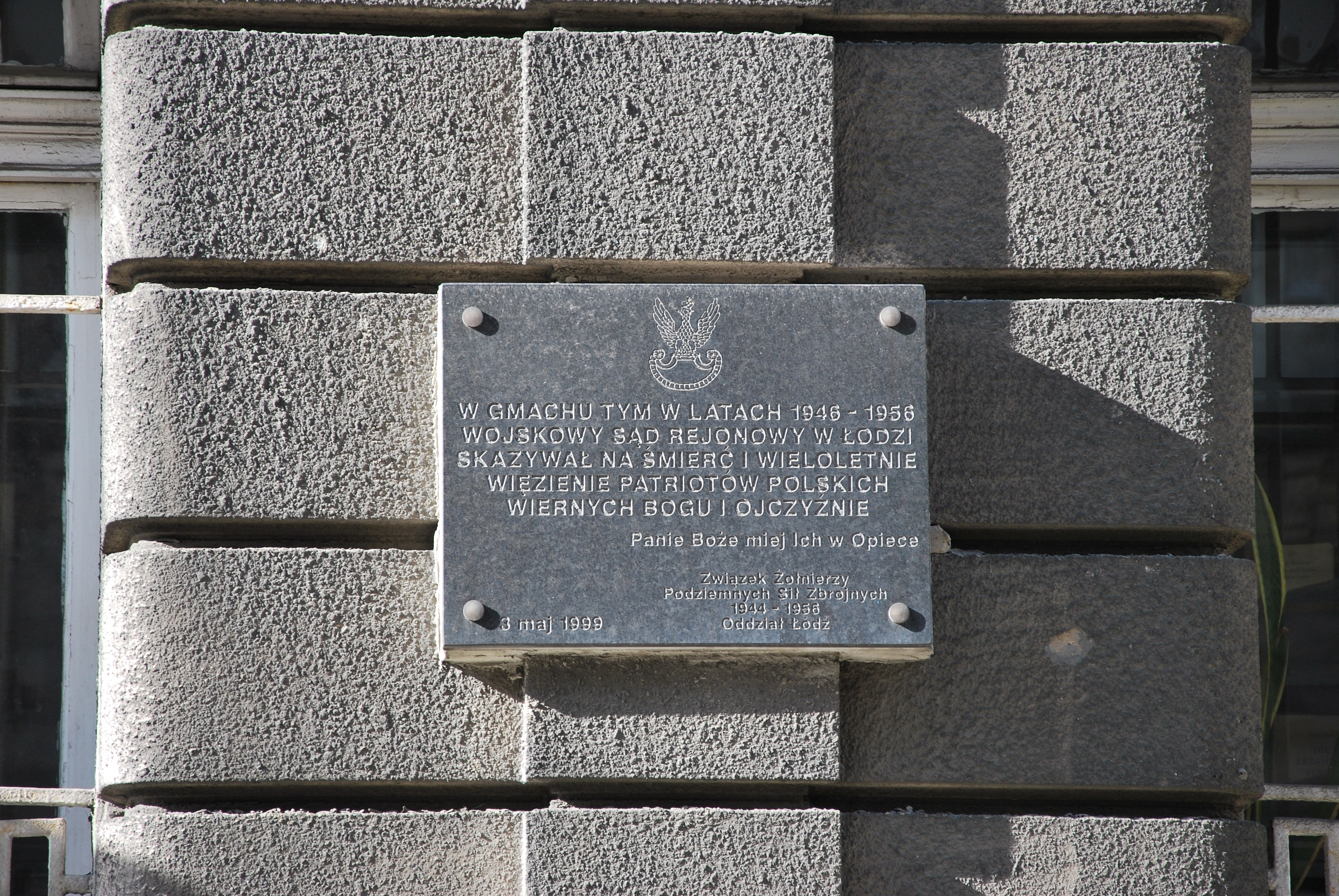
Plaque commemorating the Military District Court at 10 Stanisław Moniuszko Street

- 2 – A commemorative plaque for the former Honoratka Café, unveiled on 23 May 2012, designed by Marian Konieczny, initiated by Leopold René Nowak, the Łódź City Office, and the Łódź Museum of Cinematography.
- 4 – Ludwik Meyer's villa (1887), registered as A/82, 20 January 1971, housing the Łódź 17 post office.
- 4a – YMCA Łódź building (A/83, 20 January 1971), designed by Wiesław Lisowski, built between 1932 and 1935, formerly the Youth House (1952–1964) and Julian Tuwim Youth Palace (1964–1993); adjacent is a Julian Tuwim bust by Elwira and Jerzy Mazurczyk, planned for relocation to Retkinia since 2011.
- 5 – Trianon Villa (1887, A/84, 20 January 1971), former official residence of mayor Władysław Pieńkowski and photographic studio of Bronisław Wilkoszewski. Since 2022, it houses Mediateka MeMo, a branch of the Łódź Municipal Library.
- 6 and 8 – Two connected Meyer villas (1887, A/263, 5 March 1965, 20 January 1971, 30 December 2015).
- 7/9 – Meyer villa (1887, A/32, 20 January 1971).
- 10 (and 21 Henryk Sienkiewicz Street) – Corner tenement by Ludwik Meyer; from 1 July 1886, it housed a post office and telegraph station (relocated from Wschodnia Street).
- 11 – House from 1885 (A/85, 20 January 1971).
