= Waldemar Bohdanowicz =

Polish politician (1941–2026)

Member of the Senate of Poland
- In office 25 November 1991 – 31 May 1993

Mayor of Łódź
- In office 29 December 1989 – 27 May 1990
- Preceded by: Jarosław Pietrzyk
- Succeeded by: Grzegorz Palka

Personal details
- Born: Waldemar Antoni Bohdanowicz; 2 June 1941 Raków, Reichskommissariat Ostland
- Died: 5 June 2026 (aged 85)
- Party: ZChN
- Education: University of Łódź; University of Warsaw
- Occupation: Trade unionist

Waldemar Antoni Bohdanowicz (2 June 1941 – 5 June 2026) was a Polish politician. A member of the Christian National Union, he served as mayor of Łódź from 1989 to 1990 and was a senator from 1991 to 1993.

Bohdanowicz died on 5 June 2026, at the age of 85.
