= List of mayors of Łódź =

The following is a list of mayors and presidents of the city of Łódź, Poland.

== List of mayors ==
=== Prior to 1815 ===
- Jan Dąbrowski, 1471-1480
- Stanisław Kaleta, 1480-1488
- Jan Dąbrowski, 1488-1504
- Mikołaj Jagiełka, 1504-1504
- Jakub Dąbrowa, 1504-1507
- Stanisław Kalata, 1507-1508
- Grzegorz Wyszek, 1509-1517
- Wawrzyniec Dąbrowski, 1518-1525
- Jan Smarzewski, 1526-1526
- Mikołaj Kochan, 1527-1532
- Wojciech Wyszek, 1532-1546
- Mikołaj Kochan, 1546-1548
- Jakub Polczyk, 1548-1549
- Mikołaj Domagała, 1550-1550
- Marcin Świgonia, 1551-1552
- Walenty Kupski, 1552-1558
- Marcin Świgonia, 1558-1559
- Mikołaj Domagała, 1560-1572
- Klimek Doczekała, 1573-1584
- Bartosz Domagała, 1602-1603
- Wojciech Stanek, 1603-1608
- Mikołaj Kasprzyk, 1608-1612
- Wojciech Stanek, 1612-1613
- Hipolit, 1613-1616
- Jan Jałocha, 1616-1617
- Wawrzyniec Michałowski, 1618-1621
- Jakub Ciupka, 1621-1625
- Wawrzyniec Michałowski, 1625-1628
- Jan Jałocha, 1628-1632
- Paweł Markowicz, 1632-1636
- Jan Rozwora, 1636-1639
- Wawrzyniec Michałowicz, 1639-1640
- Błażej Ferens, 1640-1643
- Jan Jałocha, 1644-1645
- Andrzej Pawłowicz, 1645-1647
- Ambroży Śmiały, 1647-1651
- Marcin Jałochowicz, 1651-1653
- Paweł Makowicz, 1653-1656
- Błażej Ferens, 1656-1657
- Wojciech Piątkowicz, 1657-1661
- Jan Markowicz, 1661-1665
- Jan Rozwora, 1665-1666
- Jan Markowicz, 1666-1679
- Wojciech Lewik vel. Lewicki, 1679-1688
- Jakub Suwała, 1688-1691
- Adam Ślusarz vel. Kałuziński, 1691-1696
- Stanisław Kulig, 1697-1698
- Adam Kałuziński, 1698-1699
- Aleksy Ostoja, 1700-1700
- Grzegorz Pełzowicz, 1700-1708
- Adam Kałuziński, 1708-1708
- Wojciehc Kozula, 1709-1709
- Adam Markowicz, 1710-1710
- Błażej Krzysztofkowicz, 1712-1715
- Kazimierz Pełzowicz, 1717-1717
- Adam Markowicz, 1719-1719
- Kazimierz Pełzowicz, 1719-1720
- Grzegorz Markowicz, 1720-1720
- Błażej Krzysztofkowicz, 1721-1723
- Józef Zakrzewicz, 1723-1727
- Błażej Krzysztofkowicz, 1727-1730
- Andrzej Drewnowicz, 1730-1732
- Wojciech Gozdowski, 1732-1733
- Andrzej Drewnowicz, 1734-1736
- Wojciech Gozdrowki, 1736-1736
- Grzegorz Kozula, 1736-1737
- Józef Zakrzewicz, 1737-1738
- Błażej Krzysztofkowicz, 1738-1739
- Antoni Kielam, 1740-1743
- Idzi Głowiński, 1743-1745
- Antoni Kielam, 1746-1748
- Wojciech Głowiński, 1748-1748
- Felicjan Zawacki, 1748-1749
- Antoni Kielam, 1749-1750
- Mikołaj Domaniewicz, 1750-1752
- Józef Drewnowicz, 1752-1752
- Józef Drewnowicz, 1753-1754
- Józef Drewnowicz, 1754-1756
- Antoni Kielam, 1760-1760
- Wojciech Głowiński, 1761-1761
- Felicjan Zawacki, 1761-1762
- Jan Gozdowski, 1762-1763
- Felicjan Zawacki, 1763-1764
- Mikołaj Domaniewicz, 1764-1765
- Felicjan Zawacki, 1766-1767
- Józef Michałkowicz, 1767-1771
- Jan Maniński, 1771-1771
- Jan Gozdowski, 1772-1773
- Józef Michałkowicz, 1773-1773
- Paweł Suwała, 1774-1774
- Jan Maniński, 1775-1777
- Aleksy Drewnowicz, 1775-1777
- Jakub Krzysztofarski, 1777-1779
- Aleksy Drewnowicz, 1779-1781
- Józef Witoński, 1782-1783
- Józef Michałkowicz, 1783-1785
- Aleksy Drewnowicz, 1785-1786
- Piotr Drewnowicz, 1786-1788
- Jan Jeżewicz, 1788-1789
- Błażej Jugowicz, 1790-1791
- Jan Pełzowski, 1791-1792
- Piotr Zakrzewicz, 1792-1793
- Michał Kuzitowicz, 1793-1794
- Piotr Drewnowicz, 1794-1794
- Józef Aufschlag, 1800-1805
- Tomasz Jeżewicz, 1806-1806
- Piotr Drewnowicz, 1807-1807
- W Dąbkowski, 1808-1808
- Antoni Czaykowski, 1809-1810

=== 1815-1919 ===
- Szymon Szczawiński, 1815-1819
- W Dąbkowski, 1815-1815
- Antoni Czaykowski, 1815-1815
- Szymon Szczawiński, 1815-1819
- Antoni Czarkowski, 1819-1820
- Karol Tangermann, 1826-1829
- Teodor Duczyński, 1830-1831
- Karol Tangermann, 1831-1841
- Franciszek Traeger, 1844-1862
- Andrzej Rosicki, 1862-1865
- Edmund Pohlens, 1865-1869
- Maurycy Taubwurcel vel. Taubworcel, 1869-1878
- Walerian Michał Makowiecki, 1878-1882
- Władysław Pieńkowski, 1882-1914
- Alfred Biedermann, 1914-1914
- Antoni Staromirski, 1914-1915
- Heinrich Schoppen, 1915-1917
- Leopold Skulski, 1917-1919

=== 1919-1989 ===
- Aleksy Rżewski, 1919–1923
- Marjan Cynarski, 1923–1927
- Wacław Maksymilian Józef Wojewódzki, 1927–1927
- Bronisław Ziemięcki, 1927–1933
- Wacław Maksymilian Józef Wojewódzki, 1933–1935
- Wacław Głazek, 1935–1936
- Mikołaj Godlewski, 1936–1939
- Jan Kwapiński vel Piotr Chałupka, 1939–1939
- Kazimierz Tomczak, 1939–1939
- Albert Leister, 1939–1939
- Franz Schiffer, 1940–1940
- Karol Marder, 1940–1941
- Werner Ventzki, 1941–1943
- Otto Bradfisch, 1943–1944
- Hans Trautwein, 1944–1945
- Kazimierz Witaszewski, 1945–1945
- Kazimierz Mijal, 1945–1947
- Eugeniusz Stawiński, 1947–1949
- Marian Minor, 1949–1950
- Ryszard Olasek, 1952–1954
- Bolesław Geraga, 1954–1956
- Edward Kaźmierczak, 1956–1971
- Jerzy Lorens, 1971–1973
- Józef Niewiadomski, 1978–1985
- Jarosław Pietrzyk, 1985–1989

=== Since 1989 ===
- Waldemar Bohdanowicz, 1989-1990
- Grzegorz Palka, 1990-1994
- Marek Czekalski, 1994-1998
- Tadeusz Matusiak, 1998-2001
- Krzysztof Panas, 2001-2002
- Krzysztof Jagiełło, 2002-2002
- Jerzy Kropiwnicki, 2002-2010
- Tomasz Sadzyński, 2010-2010
- Paweł Paczkowski, 2010-2010
- Hanna Zdanowska, 2010-

== See also ==
- Timeline of Łódź
