= Mediateka MeMo =

Multimedia library in Łódź, Poland

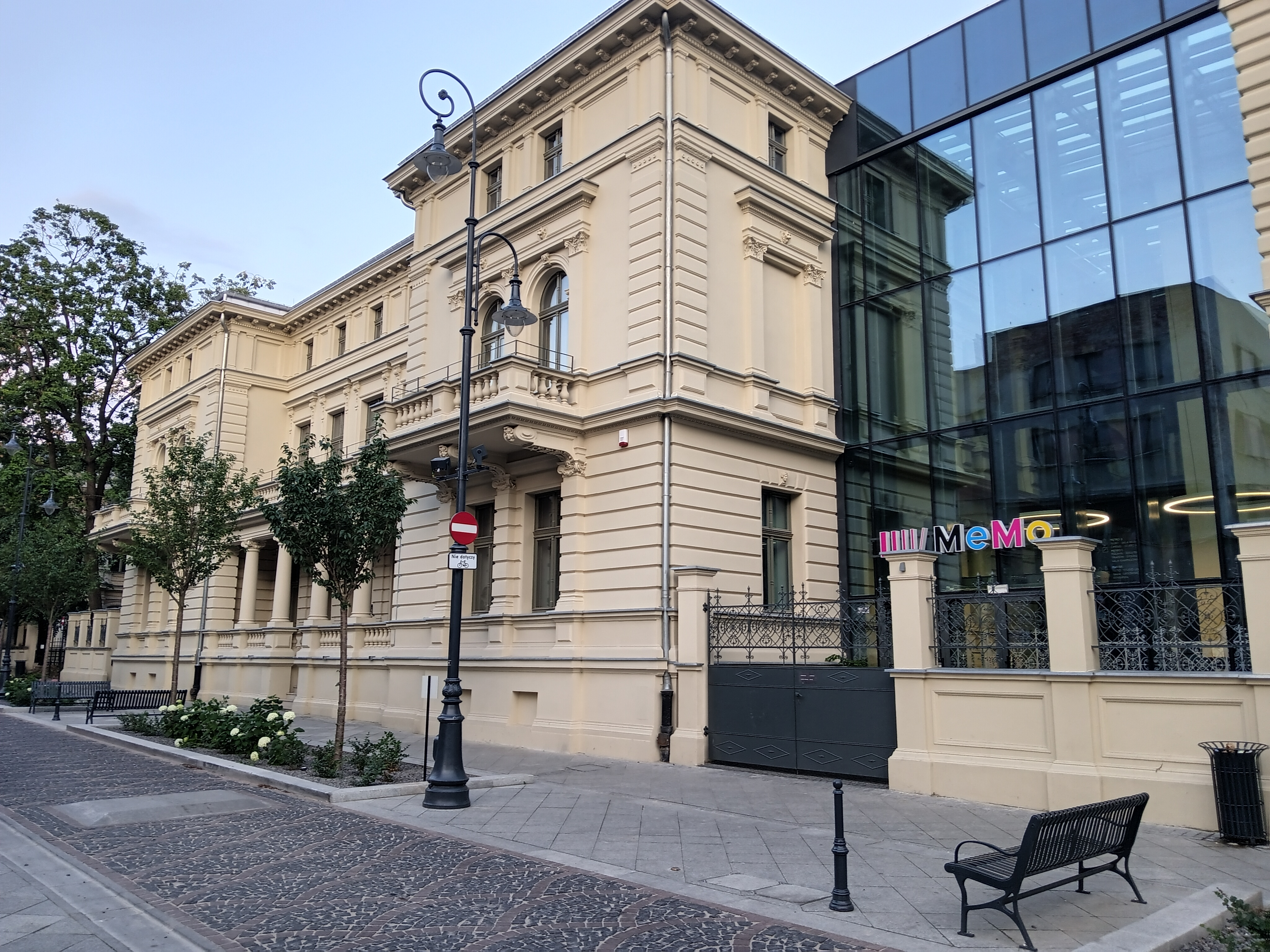
- Main entrance to Mediateka MeMo
- 51°46′4.530″N 19°27′31.183″E
- Location: 5 Stanisława Moniuszki Street, Łódź, Poland
- Type: Public library
- Established: 22 November 2022
- Branch of: Łódź City Library

Collection
- Size: Approximately 31,000 items

Other information
- Website: memo.lodz.pl

Mediateka MeMo is a public multimedia library in Łódź, Poland, operating as Branch No. 29 of the Łódź City Library. Located at 5 Stanisława Moniuszki Street, the institution combines traditional library services with digital technologies, educational facilities and cultural programming.

The library occupies the restored historic villa of industrialist Ludwik Meyer and forms part of the urban regeneration programme known as New Centre of Łódź (Nowe Centrum Łodzi).

Registered members of the Łódź City Library network may use the collections and facilities with a standard library card.

== History ==
The library is housed in the historic villa at 5 Stanisława Moniuszki Street, formerly owned by the Łódź industrialist Ludwik Meyer. The building formed part of the so-called Meyer Passage, a private street developed between 1883 and 1885 connecting Piotrkowska Street with what is now Sienkiewicza Street. The passage was originally intended as an exclusive residential area for high-ranking officials of the Russian Empire before later becoming home to members of Łódź's industrial and social elite.

The villa, together with the neighbouring building at No. 3, survived the Second World War and was included in the New Centre of Łódź revitalisation programme. The project aimed to restore both historic buildings while adapting them for new public functions.

Plans to establish a multimedia library in the villa were announced in 2017. The redevelopment project, valued at approximately PLN 36.25 million, was carried out by a consortium consisting of Budomal, Mosaicon and BTIB-BAU under the supervision of the Municipal Investment Authority. Restoration works included conservation of the historic façades, reconstruction of architectural details based on conservation records and the adaptation of the interiors for library, educational and multimedia use.

The adjacent buildings at Nos. 3 and 5 were connected by a glazed courtyard containing exhibition space and a café. New facilities created within the complex included multifunctional rooms, a recording studio and workshop spaces, while the neighbouring building was adapted for offices of the Łódź City Office.

Construction works were completed in 2021. The library, whose name "MeMo" derives from Mediateka Moniuszki, officially opened on 22 November 2022.

In September 2024, Mediateka MeMo received first prize in the Revitalisation of Historic Buildings category of the 28th nationwide Modernization of the Year & Construction of the 21st Century competition, recognising the restoration of the historic Meyer villa and its adaptation for public use.

== Facilities ==
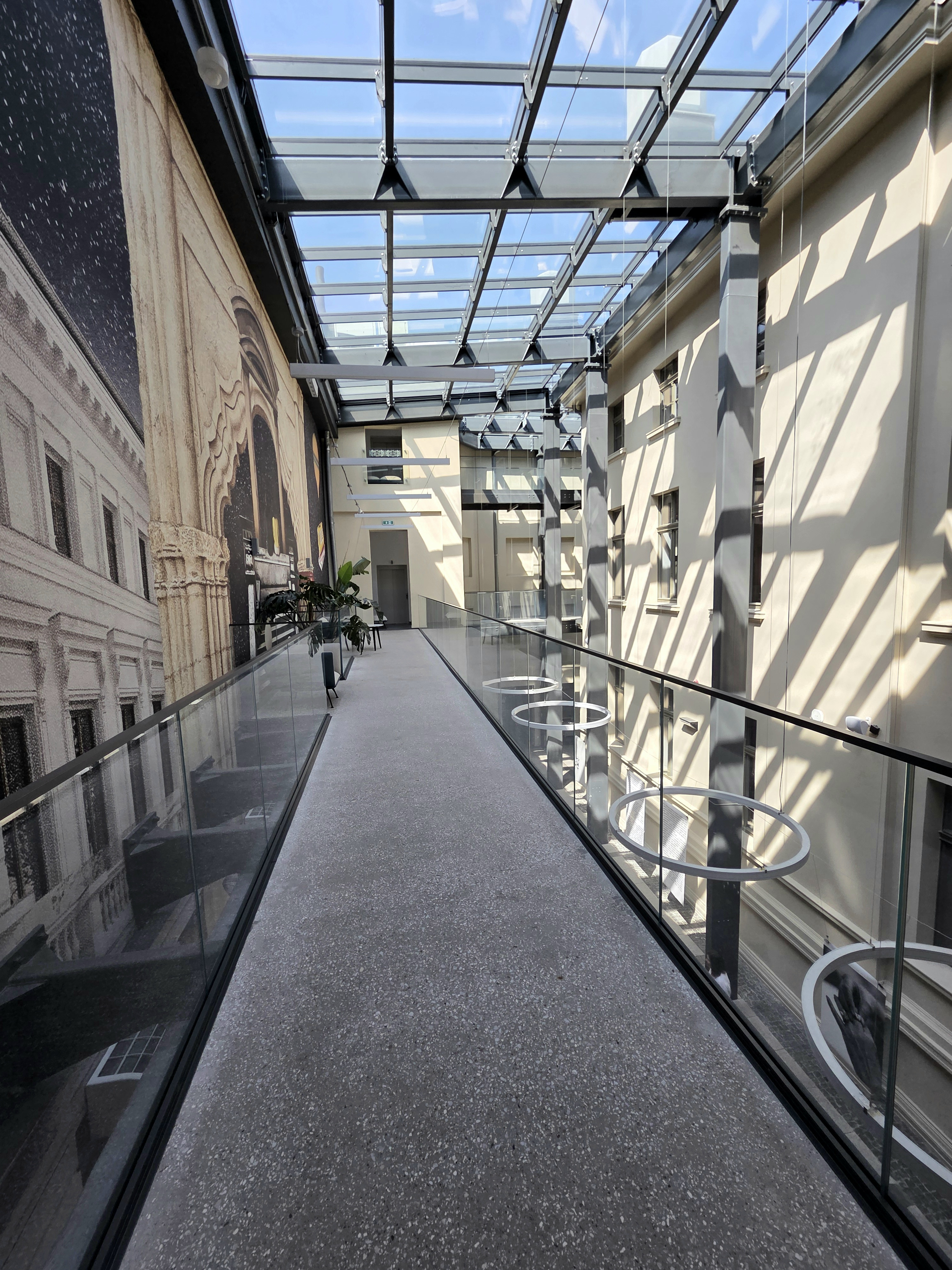
Interior of the Mediateka MeMo (2026)

Mediateka MeMo occupies three floors of the restored Meyer villa and combines traditional library services with multimedia, educational and creative spaces. The building contains open-access reading rooms, children's and young adult areas, a specialised comics and manga collection, music facilities, gaming rooms and spaces for workshops and public events.

A central glazed courtyard functions as a public gathering space for exhibitions, meetings and cultural events. The complex also includes a café open to library users and visitors.

Facilities include:

- children's library and family zone ("Bullerbyn");
- dedicated young adult reading area ("Polana");
- comics and manga collection ("Multiwersum");
- music room with instruments and vinyl records ("Dysonans");
- gaming room equipped with PlayStation and Xbox consoles, virtual reality systems and gaming computers;
- recording studio for podcasts, audiobooks and music production;
- audio and video editing suite;
- photographic and film studio with professional equipment;
- makerspace with 3D-printing facilities;
- accessible computer laboratory adapted for users with disabilities;
- small cinema used for film screenings and meetings of the library's film club;
- multifunctional lecture and workshop hall for educational and cultural events.

== Collections ==
The library holds approximately 31,000 items, including around 27,000 books and more than 4,000 comics and graphic novels. Its collections include Polish and foreign literature, children's books, young adult fiction, non-fiction, biographies, periodicals and publications relating to the city of Łódź.

One of the library's distinctive features is its extensive comics and manga department, which includes American, European and Japanese publications together with graphic novels and board games. The music collection is complemented by a listening area and a collection of vinyl records, including the collectible OSCAR turntable designed by Polish designer Wojciech Samołyk.

== Activities ==
Mediateka MeMo functions as a cultural, educational and multimedia centre in addition to providing conventional public library services. The institution organises a year-round programme of lectures, author meetings, exhibitions, workshops and community events for children, teenagers and adults.

Regular activities include book launches, literary discussions, comics and manga meetings, philosophy and science lectures, music events and educational programmes organised in cooperation with cultural institutions, universities and local organisations.

The library also offers practical workshops in photography, filmmaking, animation, audio production, digital technologies and creative arts. Multimedia facilities, including the recording studio, editing suite and photographic studio, are made available for educational projects and community initiatives.

Gaming and popular culture constitute another area of activity. MeMo hosts board game and role-playing game meetings, video game events, film screenings and regular sessions of its film club, reflecting the institution's emphasis on multimedia culture alongside traditional library services.

Participation in most activities is free of charge for registered users of the Łódź City Library network, while new library cards may be obtained at the branch.
