= Henryk Sienkiewicz Park, Łódź =

Park in Łódź, Poland

Henryk Sienkiewicz Park
- Mikołajewski City Garden
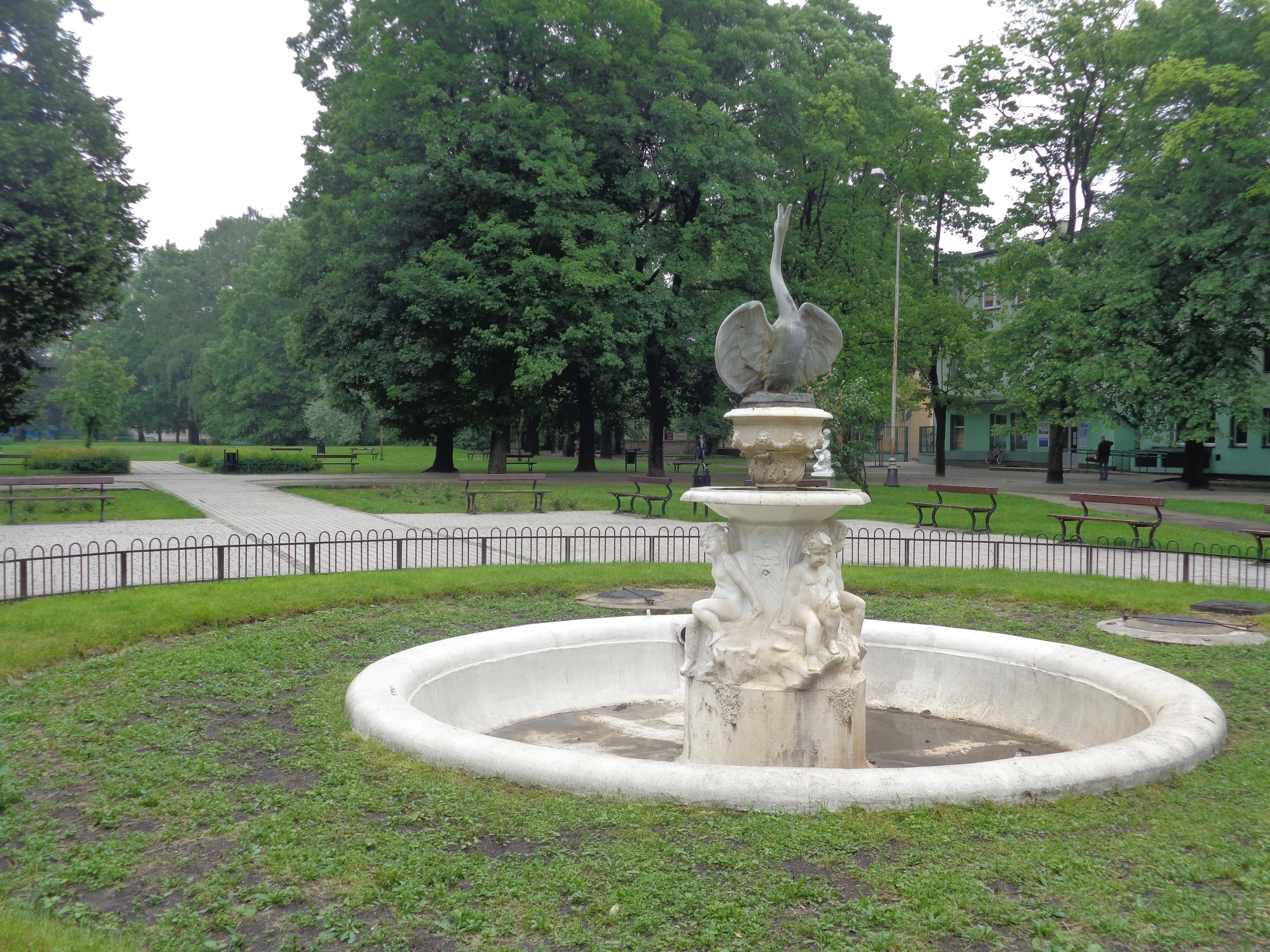
- Sienkiewicz Park (contemporary view)
- Interactive map of Henryk Sienkiewicz Park
- Type: Public park
- Location: Łódź, Poland
- Coordinates: 51°45′53″N 19°27′51″E
- Area: 5.2 ha (13 acres)
- Opened: 1894–1897
- Designer: Teodor Chrząński, Piotr Hoser

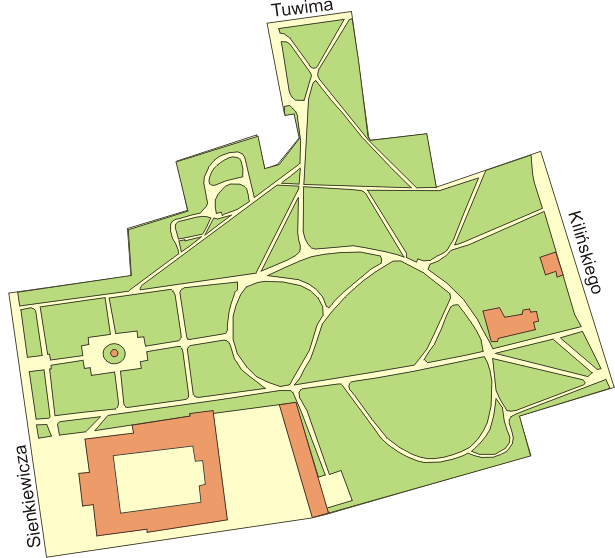
Sienkiewicz Park (map)

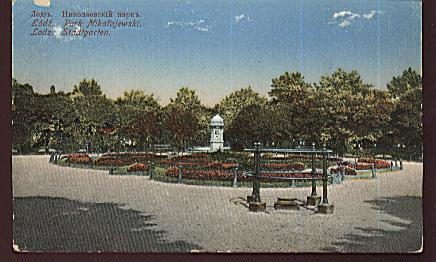
Mikołajewski Park (photo from the early 20th century)

Henryk Sienkiewicz Park (formerly the Holy Cross Park) is a public park in Łódź covering 5.2 ha, located within the bounds of Jan Kiliński, Henryk Sienkiewicz, and Julian Tuwim streets.

== History ==
The park was established as the third public park in Łódź, after Źródliska Park (1840) and the Railway Park (now Stanisław Moniuszko Park) (1875). The densely built factory city lacked green spaces open to all residents; at the time there were parks at the estates of Łódź factory owners and other private parks, but only a few had access to them. In 1893 an idea emerged, and in 1894 was accepted by the Magistrate, to create a park in the city centre on land where markets had been held (the marketplace was relocated to Targowa Street). The park was to extend between Mikołajewska Street (now Sienkiewicza), Widzewska Street (Kilińskiego), Nawrot Street, and Przejazd Street (Tuwima). Works on developing the land began in 1896; the park design was produced by Teodor Chrząński in collaboration with Piotr Hoser. The unpaved square was cleared, paths were laid out, over a thousand trees and nearly 5,000 shrubs were planted, and the whole was enclosed with an iron fence. The park was opened to the residents of Łódź in 1899 and was originally named the "Mikołajewski City Garden". The park's name relates to the name of the street on which it was located, Mikołajewska Street, though it was most commonly known by Łódź residents as the "Holy Cross Park," since it was situated next to the Church of the Exaltation of the Holy Cross. Since 1916, the park has borne the name of Henryk Sienkiewicz, given to it following the writer's death.

Part of the park's modest area was designated for buildings, including the first headquarters of the City Plantations Directorate, greenhouses, and workshops. In subsequent years, Stevenson screens and a sundial were installed. At the beginning of the 20th century, terracotta animal figurines appeared on the lawns between the trees, and porcelain signs with species descriptions were placed on the trees. In 1904, a Konditorei was opened in the southern part of the park; a large building with a veranda was rebuilt in 1924 and handed over to the Municipal Art Gallery (now the Center for Art Promotion), while the confectionery was relocated closer to Kilińskiego Street to a building now housing the Natural History Museum. Charitable open-air events were held in the park (in 1917 a concert was organised whose proceeds were donated towards rebuilding the burnt-out Rzgów). In 1922, a swan-shaped fountain appeared in the park, surrounded by putti. In time the sculpture was removed; in 1998 it was recreated to a design by Zofia Władyka-Łuczak and Zbigniew Władyka.

In the 1930s, minor changes were made to the park by E. Templin and subsequently Stefan Rogowicz, including the appearance in the central part of the park – following the English park tradition – of exotic plants. In summer, banana trees, agaves, and palms were put on display. A children's playground also appeared. After the war, the park expanded slightly by the addition of a plot connecting it with Tuwima Street, though it was reduced on the southern side where a primary school and swimming pool were built. In the 1990s, the park's sculptures and fountain were renovated, the tree stock was refreshed, and a second children's playground was built (closer to Sienkiewicza Street).

In June 2009, the first place in the city where people could freely express their views – including organising rallies, debates, and gatherings of more than 15 people without obtaining special permits – was established in Sienkiewicz Park. The concept was modelled on London's Hyde Park.

On 10 October 2012, the Plastuś monument was ceremonially unveiled in Sienkiewicz Park – the fifth sculpture created as part of the Łódź Bajkowa tourist trail.

In October 2018, as part of the general revitalisation plan for Łódź city centre, renovation works began in the park, consisting of laying new granite surfaces on most paths, renovation of the fountain, rebuilding of the playgrounds, replacement of small architectural elements, renovation of fencing and lighting, and construction of an underground irrigation system.
