= Dziennik Łódzki =

Polish daily newspaper

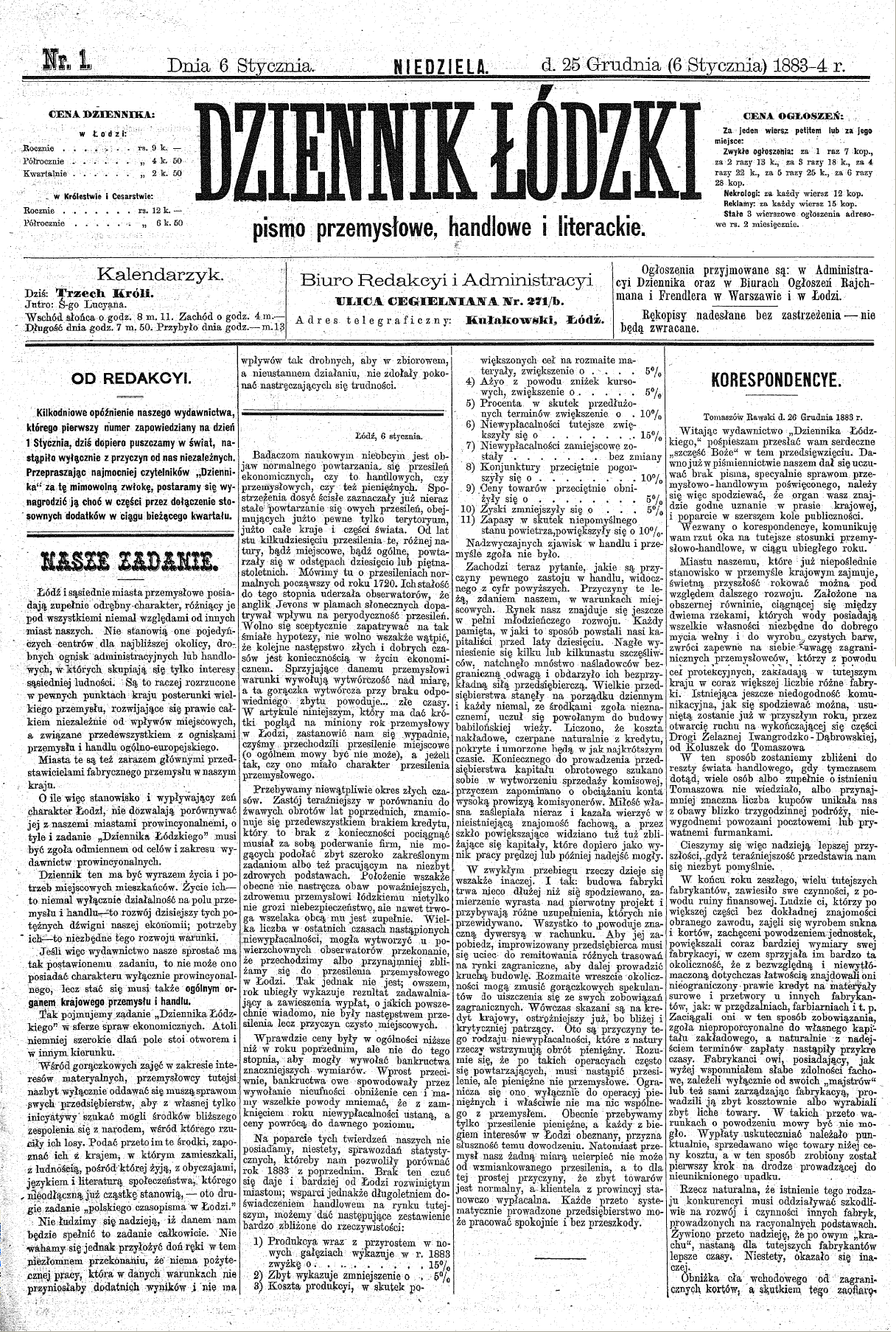
- Front page of an original 1884 issue
- Type: Daily newspaper
- Owner: Polska Press
- Editor: Marcin Kowalczyk
- Founded: 1884; 142 years ago
- Language: Polish
- Headquarters: Łódź
- Circulation: 15,135
- ISSN: 1898-3111
- Website: www.dzienniklodzki.pl

Dziennik Łódzki (Polish pronunciation: [ˈd͡ʑɛn.ɲik ˈwut͡s.ki], Łódź Diary in English) is a newspaper from the Łódź Voivodeship and one of the oldest in Poland. It has been published six times a week since 1884. In 2000, it was merged with the daily Wiadomości Dnia. Its offices are in Łódź.

== History ==
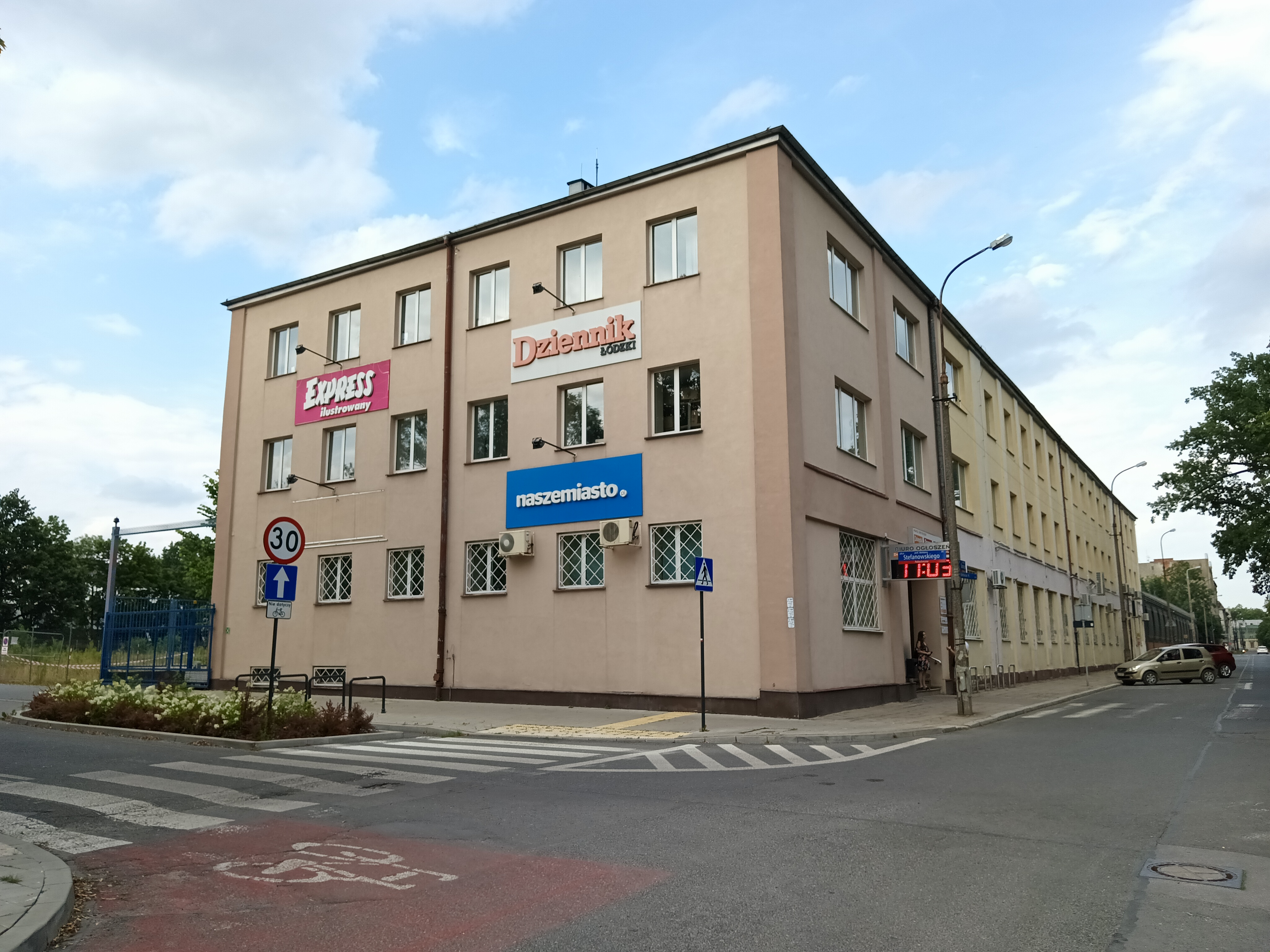
Dziennik Łódzki's editorial office in Łódź

The first issue of Dziennik Łódzki was published on 6 January 1884: it had 4 pages. The editor-in-chief of the paper was the publicist and former collaborator of the Lodzer Gazeta (supplement to the Lodzer Zeitung) Henryk Elzenberg. From July 1885 to July 1888, the editorial office, administration and printing house of the newspaper were located in the premises of the Hamburg Hotel (later called Imperial Hotel) in Chaim Bławat's tenement house at 17 Piotrkowska Street.

Officially, the publisher was initially Zdzisław Kułakowski (from 6 January 1884 to 13 February 1885) and then Stefan Kossuth (from 25 February 1885 to 31 December 1892), while nominally, the editors responsible were: Zdzisław Kułakowski (from 6 January 1884 to 26 August 1886), Antoni Chomętowski (from 27 August 1886 to 20 August 1889) and Bolesław Knichowiecki (from 21 August 1889 to 31 December 1892). However, it is Elzenberg to whom the Dziennik owes its development. It was, among others, thanks to his efforts that the newspaper received financial support from Edward Herbst. Herbst's support allowed the paper to function smoothly for at least the first two years. Thanks to the support of the factory owner, Dziennik had its own printing house, journalists were paid on time, and their salaries were comparable to those of the best newspapers in Poland at that time.

The daily initially had a tabloid format. The volume was usually four columns, sometimes accompanied by extras, such as longer fragments of a novel or an advertisement. The first page was usually a full-page text on economic issues, supplemented with quotations from stock exchanges. The second page was occupied by texts on "Industry and Trade". Then were the "Łódź Chronicle", the "National and International Chronicle", and "Telegrams", which were to serve as a substitute for political texts in the newspaper. The third page was supplemented with the statistics of population movement, which also included important hotel guests staying in Łódź at that time. The last page was filled with advertisements.

The title the shut down in 1892. It reopened for a year in 1919, but was not successful and was discontinued.

On 19 September 1931, the first issue of Dziennik Łódzki - an Independent Morning Magazine was published as a continuation of the 19th century Dziennik and the 1919 daily. On 22 June 1932 its name was changed to The Illustrated Journal of Łódź. The newspaper had eight pages in A3 format.

The newspaper's publishing cycle was interrupted by World War II. On 1 February 1945 the first post-war issue of DŁ was published with 4 pages. There were 10 issues published, at which point the journal stopped its activities again. On 6 July 1945 the publication was resumed. From 1 July 1975 to 30 December 1980, the newspaper was published under the name Dziennik Popularny. During the communist era, the newspaper was one of three daily newspapers published in the province of Łódź (along with the Express Ilustrowany and Głos Robotniczy).

As part of the 1990s liberalization of the economy, Dziennik Łódzki was sold to a company created by circles linked to Christian National Union and the French Hersant group. In 1994, the title was bought from Hersant by the Polska Press group, which merged the editorial office of Dziennik Łódzki with that of Wiadomości Dnia in 2000, creating the largest regional newspaper in the province of Łódź. The same group also owns another daily newspaper in Łódź, the Express Ilustrowany.

In 2007, the newspaper changed its name to Polska Dziennik Łódzki. On 4 January 2011, the title changed back to Dziennik Łódzki. The Polish Times logo disappeared from the front page in January 2015.
