= Damian Radowicz =

Polish footballer

Personal information
- Full name: Damian Radowicz
- Date of birth: 20 December 1989 (age 36)
- Place of birth: Łódź, Poland
- Height: 1.78 m (5 ft 10 in)
- Position: Midfielder

Youth career
- ChKS Łódź

Senior career*
Years	Team	Apps	(Gls)
2007–2009	Czarni Radomsko		
2009–2010	Omega Kleszczów	24	(0)
2010–2012	Widzew Łódź	5	(0)
2013–2014	Mechanik Radomsko	11	(0)
2014	Sokół Aleksandrów Łódzki	1	(0)
2019	Start Brzeziny	5	(0)
2026–	KS 67 Stars	5	(1)
- * Club domestic league appearances and goals

Damian Radowicz (born 20 December 1989) is a Polish former professional footballer who played as a midfielder.

== Career ==
=== Club ===
In September 2010, he joined senior team of Widzew Łódź.
